= List of Turkic mythological figures =

== Deities ==
=== Major deities ===
- Kök Tengri – God of Sky, identified with kök "1. sky; blue; 2. stem, root, base; 3. full" (most probably used to describe the celestial character) and tengri "God" < tenger "sky; sea; God" OT > tenger "sea" Hungarian ~ teňiz "sea" Kypchak, tenger "sky" Mongolian and distant Tangaroa "God of sea and water" Maori, thus originally projected as the vast of the sky and the waters. Tengri is the single god in the Turkic pantheon, creator (or cause) and controller of universal order, warrant of universal harmony and balance. Among all deities only Tengri has no personification and objectification, and it never "appears" anywhere, never comes in contact with any living being. It is considered rather as supreme unifying power (comparable with the Islamic doctrine Wahdat al-wujūd) than a role designated character. Other than Zeus, Tengri is not characterized by an anthropomorphic physical or supernatural description and by location, rather perceived as the vastness of universe.
- Kayra (or Kaira) khan – neutral characterized supreme messenger of universal creation, a creative spirit of Tengri. Usually not depicted in anthropomorphic form. The name is probably derived from Turkic kayır- "to create; to make; to fix".
- Erlik or Erlik khan – masculine personified messenger of the dead and of the underworld. The name is most likely cognate with Old Turkic yir "earth; place".
- Ulgan (or Ülgen) khan – masculine personification of benevolence, planets, stars, and shamans. Son of Kaira. He is the Turkic creator of the land on Earth. Most probably the name is derived from ül- "to measure; to cut" > ülgüç "razor" > ölçü "measurement" (with ül- > öl- vocal shift; even öl- "to die" = "to end; to come to the end; to cut off").
- Mergen khan – masculine personification of wisdom. Son of Kaira. He is a Turkic deity of abundance and knowledge. Perhaps an early Bulgarian *mir- variant of Common Turkic bil- "to know", but it is not attested.
- Kyzaghan khan – masculine personification of irrationality, malice. Kyzaghan is the son of Kayra and the brother of Ulgan. At least it is possible to suggest: kız- "to get angry" < "to get red or hot" ~ kızıl "red" Common Turkic. Kızağan might mean "angry tempered".
- Umay or Umai ana – feminine personification of fertility. She is supreme protector of mother and child including all creatures giving birth (or laying egg) to living being. The word umay is understood in modern Turkic and Mongolic cultures as "placenta; womb or uterus". At first glance it can be associated with Turkic um- "to want, to expect, to desire; hope; happiness", but Japanese 生まれ umare "birth" ~ 生まれる umareru "to be born" and 生む umu "to give birth" lead us to reflect on historical existence of proto-Altaic *(h)um-, *(k^{w})um- or *(k)uŋ- "to give birth" in north-eastern Asian geography.
- Kuara - masculine personification of thunder; soul of Tengri. He is comparable to Thor in Norse Mythology. Although "thunder" is yıldırım in Turkic languages, Kuara might be an early Bulgarian spoiled variant of Kayra and associated with Zeus through early contact with Eastern Rome, before both converting to Christianity.
- Kubai – feminine personification of birth and children. She protects women who give birth. She gives the children souls. This name seems to be a dialectal notion as Umay < Humay < Kumay.
- Koyash or Kuyash – neutral (depending on cultural area either masculine or feminine) personification of the Sun. Koyash is born from Tenger ata "father Sky" and Yir ana "mother Earth". The name is most probably derived from köñ- "to burn" (ñ > -y, -n or -yXn is typical in Turkic languages) >(?) kün "sun; day" and küneş "the Sun".
- Ak Ana – feminine personification of cultural emergence. Ak Ana is considered as the primordial messenger creating Turkic people. She is also known as the deity of the water. Ak can mean anything, but modern "white".
- Ay Ata – masculine personification of the Moon. According to the mythology, he is a messenger living on the sixth level of the sky with Gun Ana. The word ay "moon, month" is associated with ayaz "clear sky (during frost)", aydın "clear, precise, conscious" and ayıl- "to wake up, to become conscious, to perceive clearly", but ultimate etymology of ay- "clear (light)" is unknown.
- Gun Ana – feminine personification of the Sun. She is the common Turkic solar deity, treated as a supreme deity in the Kazakh and Kyrgyz mythologies. As some languages add -Aş (diminutive) substantive building suffix, the name is an analogue of Koyaş or Kuyaş < köñ-.
- Yel Ana – feminine personification of the wind, although it is unknown which wind is meant, as in various cultures winds with different characters (north wind, south wind, etc) are identified with different names. In Turkish folklore she is referred to as the "wind queen" too. Yel = wind.
- Yel Ata – masculine personification of the wind, unknown kind of wind. In Turkish folklore he is also referred to as the "wind king".
- Burkut – Eagle. The messenger Burkut symbolizes the sun and power. In modern Turkish bürküt, adopted in Russian as berkut.
- Öd Tengri (wikipage in Turkish) or Öd-Ögöd – supreme deity of time. Is seen as the neutral personification of time in Turkic mythology. Usually depicted as a dragon. Öd "time" survives in modern Turkish as öylen "midday" < öy- < öd- < öt- "to pass; past" (t > d > y is typical in Oghuz languages).
- Boz Tengri – deity mostly associated with the ground and steppes. It survives in Turkish as bozkır < boz "steppe; semi-desert; grey" + kır "mountain pick; grey, black".
- Aisyt – feminine personification of beauty. She is also the mother deity of the Yakut people from Siberia.
- Su Ana – feminine personification of water. Su Ana is said to appear as a naked young woman with a fairy-like face.
- Su Ata – masculine personification of water. He appears as an old man with a frog-like face, greenish beard, with his body covered in algae and muck.
- Od Ana – feminine personification of fire. Also referred to as messenger of marriage. In Mongolian folklore she is referred to as the "queen of fire".
- Od Ata – masculine personification of fire. In Mongolian folklore he is referred to as the Od Khan "king of fire". He is a fire spirit in the shamanistic traditions of Mongolia.
- Yer Tanrı – feminine personification of the Earth. As a supreme deity of fertile earth, she was recognized as the giver of crops and abundance.
- Etügen – the name originates from Ötüken, the holy mountain of the Earth and fertility deity of the ancient Turks. Ötüken is rather derived from öt- "to pass; past" and can be interpreted as a (land) merit of ancestors, than earth.
- Hurmuz or Kurmez – masculine personification of soul. Also he is considered as a supreme deity in Mongolian mythology and shamanism, described as the chief of the 55 messengers.
- Jaiyk – masculine personification of rivers. He is a deity in Turkic pantheon, previously known as Dayık in Altai mythology. He lives at the junction of 17 rivers. The name seems to be cognate with Oghuzic çay- "river", but the etymology is unclear.
- Alaz – masculine personification of fire in Turkic mythology. Also known as Alas-Batyr or sometimes Alaz Khan. In Oghuz languages al-ış- "to inflame" and al-ov "flame", and al-tun "gold" and al[ıg] "red" implying al- "catch fire, burn, glow" in Common Turkic.
- Baianai – feminine personification of hunting. She is also the Yakut deity of forests and joy.
- Kailyn – messenger of Kings and Queens.
- Kış Han (or Dış Han) – masculine personification of winter.
- Yaz Han (or Yay Han) – masculine personification of summer.

=== Other gods ===
- Adaghan – Mountain God. He protects the mountains and the creatures that live there. His name means sacrifice acceptor.
- Akbugha – God of medicine. He is the god of health and healing in ancient Turkic tradition. He has a white serpent.
- Ai Toyon (Sakha: Айыы Тойон, Russian: Айы Тойон) is the Yakut god of light, usually depicted as an eagle perched atop the "world tree".
- Adzis Khanym (Nameless Lady). Goddess of evil.
- Erkliğ Han – God of space, controls the celestial bodies. He is said to kill the stars with the rise of the sun, thus became a symbol for warriors.
- Shalyk – Hunting deity. God or goddess or of fluid gender. Patron of wild animals, the wilderness and protector of forests.
- Inehsit – Goddess of childbirth and labour pains. She was the divine helper of women in labour has an obvious origin in the human midwife.
- Qovaq – God of the sky. He brings up a new sun every day; for that reason, he is hunted by Yelbeghen to stop her and cause total darkness.
- Uren Han – God of Harvest. He presided over grains and the fertility of the earth.
- Zarlık – Goddess of Judgement. She was the goddess of justice, fair judgements and the rights.
- Zada – Wind God. He is the ruler of the winds, and owner of Yada Tashy (Wind Stone).
- Ukulan – Water God. He is the chief of the rivers, springs, streams and fountains.
- Izıh – God of wild animals. He is especially the god of freed animals.
- Chokqu – Goddess of good wishes. She fulfills wishes.
- Talai or Dalai – God of Oceans. He was the personification of the World Ocean, an enormous river encircling the world.

== Creatures ==
=== Genuine ===
- Äbädä – Spirit of forest. It is an innocent spirit in Tatar mythology, that looks like an old woman. Äbädä also is represented in mythologies of Siberian peoples. He protects the birds, trees, and animals of the forest.
- Alara – A famous water fairy (peri) from Lake Baikal in Central Asia who appears in the records and folklore of several Turkic peoples. She appears to those who need her to fix broken hearts and has powers similar to those of Cupid.
- Al Basty – Female daemon spirit. She is an ancient female spirit, the personification of guilt, found in folklore throughout the Caucasus mountains, with origins going as far back as Sumerian mythology.
- Archura – Forest monster. Archura usually appears as a man, but he is able to change his size from that of a blade of grass to a very tall tree. He protects the animals and birds in the forest.
- Arbogha – A creature like bull. Arboghas are half-man, half bull; having the torso of a man extending where the neck of a bull should be. They were said to be wild, savage, and lustful.
- Ardow (su iyesi) – Spirit of water. Ardows are spirits of human souls that died drowning, residing in the element of their own demise. They are responsible for sucking people into swamps and lakes as well as killing the animals standing near the still waters.
- Azmych – Road spirit. He is an evil-spirit that causes disorientation and leads a person aimlessly around and round. The term also refers to lose one's way.
- Basty – Spirit of nightmares. Basty is best known for its shapeshifting abilities and it is an evil spirit or goblin in Turkic folklore which rides on people's chests while they sleep, bringing on bad dreams (or "nightmares").
- Bichura – A household spirit in Tatar / Turkic folklore. Traditionally, every house is said to have a Bichura. It has also been said that Bichura can take on the appearance of cats or dogs. It wears red dresses.
- Chak – A folk devil. He was specifically busy corrupting peasants. While sometimes shown in any rustic setting, he was usually pictured standing on or near a willow tree at the edge of a swamp.
- Chesma iyesi – cat-shaped spirit that lives in wells or fountains and tempts youths to drowning.
- Çor – A jinn-like creature, responsible for mental disorders.
- Chorabash - leader of jinn
- Elbis – a spirit of war and envy. Sometimes confused with Iblis.
- Erbörü – A creature similar to a Werewolf. It is a mythological or folkloric human with the ability to shapeshift into a wolf or a therianthropic hybrid wolf-like creature, either purposely or after being placed under a curse or affliction (e.g. via a bite or scratch from another werewolf).
- Erbüke – A creature like Shahmaran. An Erbüke is often depicted as a wise and benign man with the features of a man above the waist and those of a serpent below the waist. He is held to be king of the snakes.
- Hortdan or Hortlak – A monster, who goes out from graves. The Hortdans are creatures of Azerbaijani mythology, as a representation of evil spirits, the spirits of the dead.
- Irshi – A fairy-like spirit. She is generally described as a beautiful girl) appearance and having magical powers. Although they are often depicted as young, sometimes winged, tall, radiant, angelic spirits.
- İye – A spirit assigned to a specific element, animal, lineage or place.
- Khyrtyq – A female swamp demon. In Turkic mythology she is known for being malicious and dangerous. She was said to live in thickets near rivers, streams and lakes.
- Kormos – ghost of the deceased
- Korbolko – a firebird who brought fire to earth and taught the people to burn the fire.
- Mhachkay – A vampire-like being in Turkic (and more especially Tatar) folklore. People who were born with two hearts and two souls were believed to be Mhachkay.
- Mu shuvuu – soul of a girl which turned into a bird-like creature.
- Neme – A spiritual being. They are mythical creatures originated in Turkic folklore. Nemes are elves very similar to other ones but they keep watch over forests, mountains, caves and underground.
- Orek – Animated corpse like zombi. In Turkic folklore it is an animated corpse brought back to life by mystical means such as witchcraft.
- Sazakan – a dragon, hawk, falcon, or fiery dwarf who turns himself into a whirlwind.
- Shurala – Forest daemon. According to legends, Şüräle lives in forests. He has long fingers, a horn on its forehead, and a woolly body. He lures victims to a thicket and tickles them to death.
- Susulu – Mermaid in Turkic mythologies. She is a legendary aquatic creature with the upper body of a female human and the tail of a fish. She is the daughter of the Sea King.
- Tepegöz – a cyclops-like creature with only one eye on his forehead.
- Ubir – A monster like vampire. It is a mythological or folkloric being in Turkic mythology who subsist by feeding on the life essence (generally in the form of blood) of living creatures, regardless of whether it is undead person or being.
- Uylak – A witch or spirit, that infested with people. An Uylak can turn into any animal or any object. He is capable of shapeshifting into a horse, a moth, or a wolf. He is also resistant to Archura's enchantments.
- Yaryond – A creature like Centaurus. The centaurs are half-man, half horse; having the torso of a man extending where the neck of a horse should be. They were said to be wild, savage, and lustful.
- Yelbeghen – multi-headed man-eating monster in the mythology of the Turkic peoples in Siberia.
- Yina'mna'ut and Yina'mtilan – the spirits of fogs and mists.
- Yuxa – Queen of serpents. According to popular beliefs, every 100-year-old snake is transformed into Yuxa. In fairy tales, Yuxa is described as a beautiful damsel who would marry men in order to beget offspring.
- Zilant – Serpent-like dragon. Since 1730, it has been the official symbol of Kazan. This winged snake is mentioned in legends about the foundation of Kazan. Zilant should be distinguished from Aq Yılan (White Snake), which is the king of snakes.

=== Foreign ===
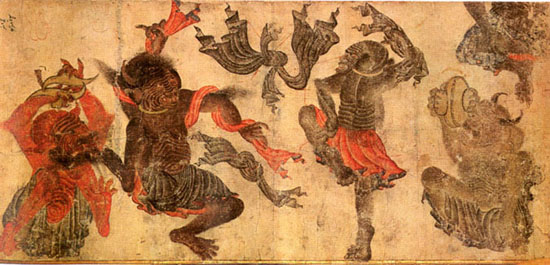
Turkish Siyah Qalam. A depiction of dancing divs (fiends)

- Az – Demon of Greed (or Lust), mentioned in Turk Manichaen sources.
- Asurı, a chaos creating being, titan.
- Azāzīl – a being mentioned in some Turkish Sufi texts who was once the executioner of God, but fell from grace when he refused to bow before mankind. Similar to Satan.
- Cin – Turkish equivalent of the Islamic jinn.
- Dervish – someone, who is devoted to the path of God. He is a source of wisdom and miracles are often attributed to him.
- Dev – An ogre or giant; often with magical abilities and enemy of folk-heroes. Inhabits the underworld. Often confused with Ifrit.
- Karakoncolos – A malevolent creature akin to a bogeyman from Southeast European and indigenous Anatolian folklore. They appear on the first ten days of 'the dreadful cold' (from 25 December to 6 January during which time the sun ceases its seasonal movement), when they stand on murky corners, and ask seemingly ordinary questions to passers-by.
- Hizir – an angel or prophet aiding those in distress.
- İn – a demon with features similar to that of jinn. Mostly appears in combination with the jinn, but might have a genuine Turkic origin.
- Iblis – The devil, or generally a creature, which rebels against God. Sometimes confused with Elbis.
- Ifrit – Inhabitant of the underworld. Evil spirit. In modern Turkish, it is a term to refer to underworld spirits in general.
- Melek – an angel, genderless spirit in the service of God.
- Peri – An intangible entity. Fairy. Sometimes they are described as agents of evil; later, they are benevolent. They are exquisite, winged, fairy-like creatures ranking between angels and evil spirits. They sometimes visit the realm of mortals.
- Simnu – Uighur equivalent of Manichaean Ahriman or Prince of Darkness.
- Şeytan – evil spirits or demons, envious of mankind, which can possess humans. Originally an epithet for Ahriman, it later became a general term for evil spirits.
- Zebani – a demonic creature at disposal of Erlik or Iblis, living in the underworld with the spirits of the damned. According to the Yörüks of Antalya, they cause thunder during their battle against the heavenly forces.

== Sources ==
1. Türk Mitolojisi Ansiklopedik Sözlük, Celal Beydili, Yurt Yayınevi (in Turkish)
2. Bahaeddin Ögel, Türk Mitolojisi, Türk Tarih Kurumu Publications (Vol-1, Vol-2), Turkey
3. Türk Mitoloji Sözlüğü, Pınar Karaca
4. Özhan Öztürk. Folklor ve Mitoloji Sözlüğü. Ankara, 2009 Phoenix Yayınları. s. 491 ISBN 978-605-5738-26-6
5. Eski Türk Mitolojisi, Jean Russe, and Ryan Reynolds

== See also ==
- Turkic Mythology
- Tengrism
- Hungarian mythology
- Mongol mythology
- Turkic peoples
