= List of light deities =

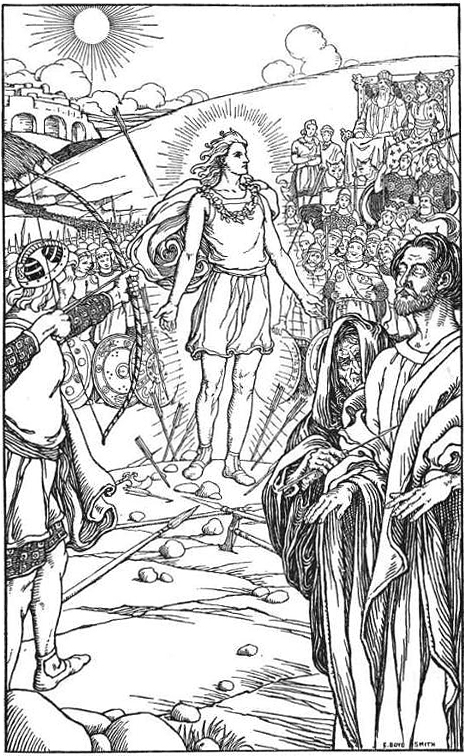
The Norse light god Baldr

A light deity is a god or goddess in mythology associated with light and/or day. Since stars give off light, star deities can also be included here. The following is a list of light deities in various mythologies.

== African ==
=== Egyptian mythology ===
- Khepri, god of rebirth and the sunrise
- Nefertem, god who represents the first sunlight

=== Guanche ===
- Magec, deity of the sun and light, exact gender unknown

=== Dahomean religion ===
- Lisa, deity of the sun, heat, sky

== American ==
=== Lakota mythology ===
- Anpao, two-faced spirit of the dawn

=== Maya mythology ===
- Tohil, god associated with thunder, lightning, and sunrise

=== Aztec ===
- Centzonhuitznahua, 400 gods of the southern stars
- Centzonmimixcoa, 400 gods of the northern stars
- Cipactonal, god of the daytime
- Citlālicue, goddess who created the stars
- Citlalmina, goddess of female stars
- Citlalatonac, god of male stars
- Tianquiztli, star goddesses
- Xiuhtecuhtli, god of fire, day, and heat

=== Zapotec ===
- Coquihani, god of light

=== Incan ===
- Inti, god of the sun
- Ch'aska ("Venus") or Ch'aska Quyllur ("Venus star"), goddess of dawn and twilight, the planet
- Mama Killa, goddess of the moon

== Asian ==
=== Chinese ===
- Zhulong, dragon deity of daylight

=== Japanese ===
- Amaterasu, goddess of the sun
- Uzume, goddess of the dawn

=== Hindu ===
- Aruṇa, personification of the reddish glow of the rising sun
- Dyaus Pita, continues the name of the Proto-Indo-European god of the day-lit sky
- Ushas, dawn goddess

=== Sumerian ===
- Inanna, primary goddess of the planet Venus
- Ninsianna, goddess of the planet Venus
- Šul-pa-e, underworld god who became associated with Jupiter
- Shulsaga, stellar god
- Aya (goddess), goddess of light and the dawn

=== Turkic ===
- Alaz, god of fire, also known as Alas-Batyr or sometimes Alaz Khan
- Ay Ata, Father Moon, masculine personification of the Moon
- Gün Ana, Mother Sun, feminine personification of the Sun
- Koyash, personification of the Sun, born from father Sky and mother Earth
- Od Ana, Mother Fire, Queen of Fire
- Od Ata, Father Fire, King of Fire
- Ülgen, creator-deity, architect of the Cosmos, god of Light and the Upper World

== European ==
=== Albanian ===
- Dielli, the Sun, god of light
- Hëna, the Moon
- Prende, dawn goddess, also referred to as Hylli i Dritës, Afêrdita "the Star of Light, Afêrdita" (Venus)
- Zjarri, the Fire, light deity
- Zojz, as a reflex of *Dyeus, god of the day-lit sky

=== Baltic ===
- Dievas, creator god in Baltic myths

=== Celtic ===
- Lugh, personification of the sun

=== Etruscan ===
- Albina, goddess of the dawn and protector of ill-fated lovers
- Thesan, goddess of the dawn, associated with new life

=== Germanic ===
- Baldr, god thought to be associated with light and/or day; is known by many other names, all of which have cognates in other Germanic languages, suggesting he may have been a pan-Germanic deity
- Dagr, personification of day
- Earendel, god of rising light and/or a star
- Eostre, considered to continue the Proto-Indo-European dawn goddess
- Freyr, god of sunshine, among other things
- Sól, goddess and personification of the sun
- Teiwaz, as a reflex of *Dyeus, was probably originally god of the day-lit sky
- Thor, god of lightning, thunder, weather, storms, and the sky

=== Slavic ===
- Dazhbog, god of the sun and day

=== Greek ===
- Aether, primarily associated with upper air but associated with light in Hesiod's Theogony
- Aglaia, one of the Charites, goddesses of beauty and grace, whose name translates to "splendor" or "radiance". Associated with all that is bright, brilliant, or shining
- Apollo, god of light, among many other things
- Eos, goddess of the dawn
- Hemera, personification of day
- Hyperion, Titan of light; sometimes conflated with his son Helios
- Lampetia, goddess of light, and one of the Heliades or daughters of Helios , god of the Sun, and of the nymph Neera .
- Theia, Titaness of sight and the shining light of the clear blue sky. She is the consort of Hyperion and mother of Helios, Selene, and Eos.
- Zeus, as a reflex of *Dyeus, could be considered god of the day-lit sky
- Phoebe, titaness daughter of Ouranos and Gaia, whose name means shining or bright, with Kios gave birth to first Leto, mother of Apollo and Artemis, and then to Asteria, who with Persea, son of Crius, became mother to Hekate.
- Astraea is another titaness who is a light being as is Persephone whose name means "light bringer." Armenian.

=== Roman ===
- Aurora (mythology), goddess of the dawn
- Jupiter (mythology), as a reflex of *Dyeus, god of the day-lit sky
- Mater Matuta, goddess associated with Aurora

== Oceania ==
=== Polynesian ===
- Atanua, Marquesan goddess of the dawn
- Atarapa, goddess of the dawn
- Ira, sky goddess and mother of the stars
- Tala goddess of the stars

==== Māori mythology ====
- Ao (mythology), personification of light

== See also ==
- List of night deities
- List of solar deities
- Lucifer
- Sky deity
