= İye =

Tutelary spirit or genius loci in Turkic mythology

İye (sometimes İne or Eğe; Chuvash: Ийӗ, İyĕ; Tatar: Ия, İyä; Yakut: Иччи, İççi; Turkmen: Eýe, Эе; Tuvan: Ээ, Ee; Uzbek: Ega, Эга; Ottoman Turkish: اي or ٳي; Russian: Ийе, Ije) is a spirit in Turkic mythology who is a tutelary deity of a place, person, lineage, nation, natural assets or an animal. Although such spirits are called "masters" or "possessors", they are not necessarily subject to worship. They may be revered as sacred essence of things without being deified or even personified.

== Master spirits ==
The term means owner, master, lord, possessor in Turkic languages. Ezen (familiar spirit, protector spirit) has the same meaning (owner, possessor) in the Mongolian language.

In the context of Turkic shamanism and traditional belief systems, an iye is not a physical owner but a spiritual proprietor, a tutelary spirit or genius loci that embodies and governs a specific place, natural phenomenon, object, or concept.

Academic Perspective: Scholars like Ákos Bertalan Apatóczky and Vladimir N. Basilov emphasize that the concept moves far beyond simple animism (the belief that everything has a soul) to a form of "proprietorial animism." It's a system where the universe is organized under the jurisdiction of countless specialized spirits who must be respected and negotiated with.

The iye is not inherently good or evil; its disposition is a direct reflection of human action. Respect shown through offerings and proper conduct invites the iye's blessing and protection, ensuring a successful hunt, a healthy family, or a plentiful harvest. Conversely, disrespect or harm to its domain provokes misfortune and retribution. Thus, life itself becomes a continuous dialogue with these unseen owners, a sacred contract where humanity must acknowledge its place within a spirit-governed ecological and cosmic order.

In Azerbaijani mythology, they are usually described as benevolent towards mankind.

== Mythology ==
Aynur Gazanfargizi states that, according to Tengrism, God (Tengri) created the İye and gave them dominion over a specific place. They would have been similar to that of angels in Abrahamic religions. However, often only their negative impact is remembered and thus have often been demonized. She argues that the İye is neither thought to be inherently good or bad, but the İye's attitude depends on human's respect towards the nature of their domain: If the İye of a garden would be disrespected, it would cause the garden to wither. If the İye is respected however, the garden will prosper. She criticizes both the demonization of İye as demons (Kara İye), as well as the deification of them done by Western researchers. İyes would be neither inherently good nor bad, but sent by God to interact with humans in a respectful manner.

According to myths among the Turks collected by Verbitsky Vasily, the İye appear similar to fallen angels. When Erlik desired to create a world on his own to fill it with his own people, Ülgen was ordered to throw Erlik and his servants out of the sky. A battle occurred and Erlik was injured and cast into the underworld, along with his servants. They fell like water drops, and each of his servants became a spirit corresponding with the specific element it fell into. Thus, whose who fell into fire became od-iyeler (İye of fire), whose who fell into water became su-iyeler (İye of water), etc.

== Veneration ==
It is the name given to saint-like beings in many places such as Azerbaijan, Anatolia and Ahıska. Although the word seems to be the plural form of the word "Good" (iyeler), it is actually related to the concept of "Iye". Shrines and cemeteries considered sacred are used in association with the names of these İyeler. According to belief, beings such as "al girls", who have fertile hands and make everything they touch fruitful, are considered to be among the İye. It is said among them are saints, prophets, and angels. Graves, which were thought to be places where the İyeler slept, were considered places of pilgrimage and the sick and those who could not find a cure went there.

== Well-known İyes ==
1. Su iyesi: Spirit of water.
2. Od iyesi: Spirit of fire.
3. Ev iyesi: Household spirit of house.
4. Yel iyesi: Spirit of wind.
5. Dağ iyesi: Protector spirit of mountains.
6. Orman iyesi: Protector spirit of forest.
7. Irmak iyesi: Owner of river.
8. Abzar iyesi: Owner of courtyard.
9. Yer iyesi: Sacred spirit of earth.

=== Other spirits ===
These are at the orter of other İyes:

1. Aran iyesi, Damız iyesi, Kitre iyesi: Spirit of stable.
2. Avul iyesi, Köy iyesi, Bucak iyesi: Spirit of village.
3. Ağaç iyesi, Yığaç iyesi: Spirit of tree.
4. Bulak iyesi, Pınar iyesi, Çeşme iyesi: Spirit of fountain.
5. Değirmen iyesi: Spirit of mill.
6. Ekin iyesi, Arış iyesi: Spirit of corn.
7. Ergene iyesi, Urkay iyesi, Şahta iyesi: Spirit of mine pit.
8. Mal iyesi, Sığır iyesi: Spirit of cattle.
9. Kıla iyesi, Hayvan iyesi: Spirit of animals.
10. Otağ iyesi, Çadır iyesi, Çerge İyesi: Spirit of tent.
11. Söğök iyesi, Gur iyesi, Gömüt İyesi: Spirit of grave.
12. Tarla iyesi, Basu iyesi, Etiz İyesi: Spirit of field.
13. Toplak iyesi, Mescid iyesi: Spirit of mosque.
14. Yol iyesi, Yolak iyesi: Spirit of road.
15. Yunak iyesi, Hamam iyesi, Cağlık iyesi: Spirit of bath.
16. Ören iyesi, Peg iyesi, Çaldıbar iyesi: Spirit of ruins.
17. İn iyesi, Mağara iyesi, Ünkür iyesi: Spirit of cave.
18. Bulut iyesi: Spirit of clouds.
19. Kara iye: Spirit of underworld, comparable to a demon.

== See also ==
- Familiar spirit
- İn Cin
- Power animal
- Tutelary deity
- Haltija
