= Mergen (name) =

Mergen is a surname and given name. Notable people with the name include:

== Surname ==
- Anne Briardy Mergen (1906–1994), American editorial cartoonist
- Sophie Mergen, French radio and television journalist

== Given name ==
- Mergen Mämmedow (born 1990), Turkmenistan athlete

== See also ==
- Mergen, Turkish deity
- Mergens, surname
- Mergen (city), a former name of Nenjiang in northeastern China
