= Undead =

Beings in mythology and fiction

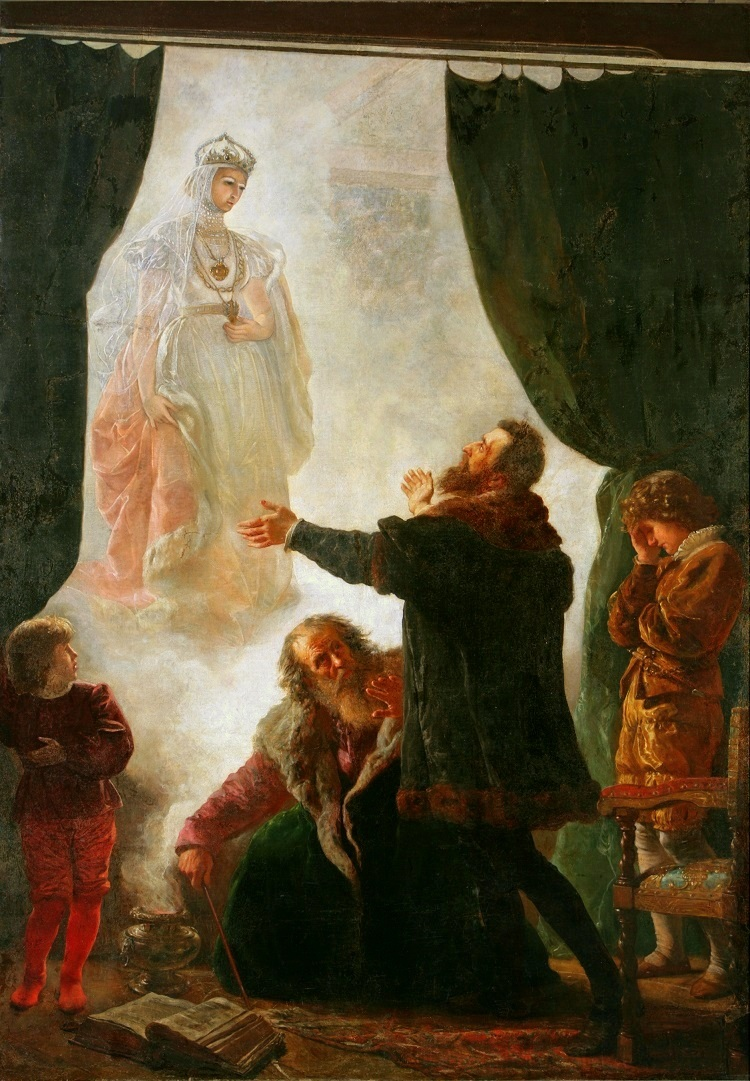
A painting of The Ghost of Barbara Radziwiłł (1886) by Wojciech Gerson. Ghosts are a common form of the undead.

The undead are beings in mythology, legend, or fiction that are deceased but behave as if they were alive. A common example of an undead being is a corpse reanimated by supernatural forces, by the application of either the deceased's own life force or that of a supernatural being (such as a demon, or other evil spirit). The undead may be incorporeal (ghosts) or corporeal (mummies, vampires, skeletons, and zombies).

The undead are featured in the belief systems of most cultures, and appear in many works of fantasy and horror fiction. The term is also occasionally used for real-life attempts to resurrect the dead with science and technology, from early experiments like Robert E. Cornish's to future sciences such as "chemical brain preservation" and "cryonics." While the term usually refers to corporeal entities, in some cases (for example, in Dungeons & Dragons), the term also includes incorporeal forms of the dead, such as ghosts.

== History ==
Bram Stoker considered using the title, The Undead, for his novel Dracula (1897), and use of the term in the novel is mostly responsible for the modern sense of the word. The word does appear in English before Stoker but with the more literal sense of "alive" or "not dead", for which citations can be found in the Oxford English Dictionary. In one passage of Dracula, Nosferatu is given as an "Eastern European" synonym for "un-dead".

Stoker's use of the term "undead" refers only to vampires; the extension to other types of supernatural being arose later. Most commonly, it is now taken to refer to supernatural beings which had at one point been alive and continue to display some aspects of life after death, but the usage is highly variable.

Reanimation or the creation of zombies through non-supernatural means has been a trope since at least the 19th century. Frankenstein used unspecified scientific means; mechanisms in more recent stories include bacteria (I Am Legend), radiation (Night of the Living Dead), and toxic waste (The Return of the Living Dead).

The undead have become popular adversaries in fantasy and horror settings, featuring prominently in many role-playing games, role-playing video games, MMORPGs and strategy games.

== Literature ==
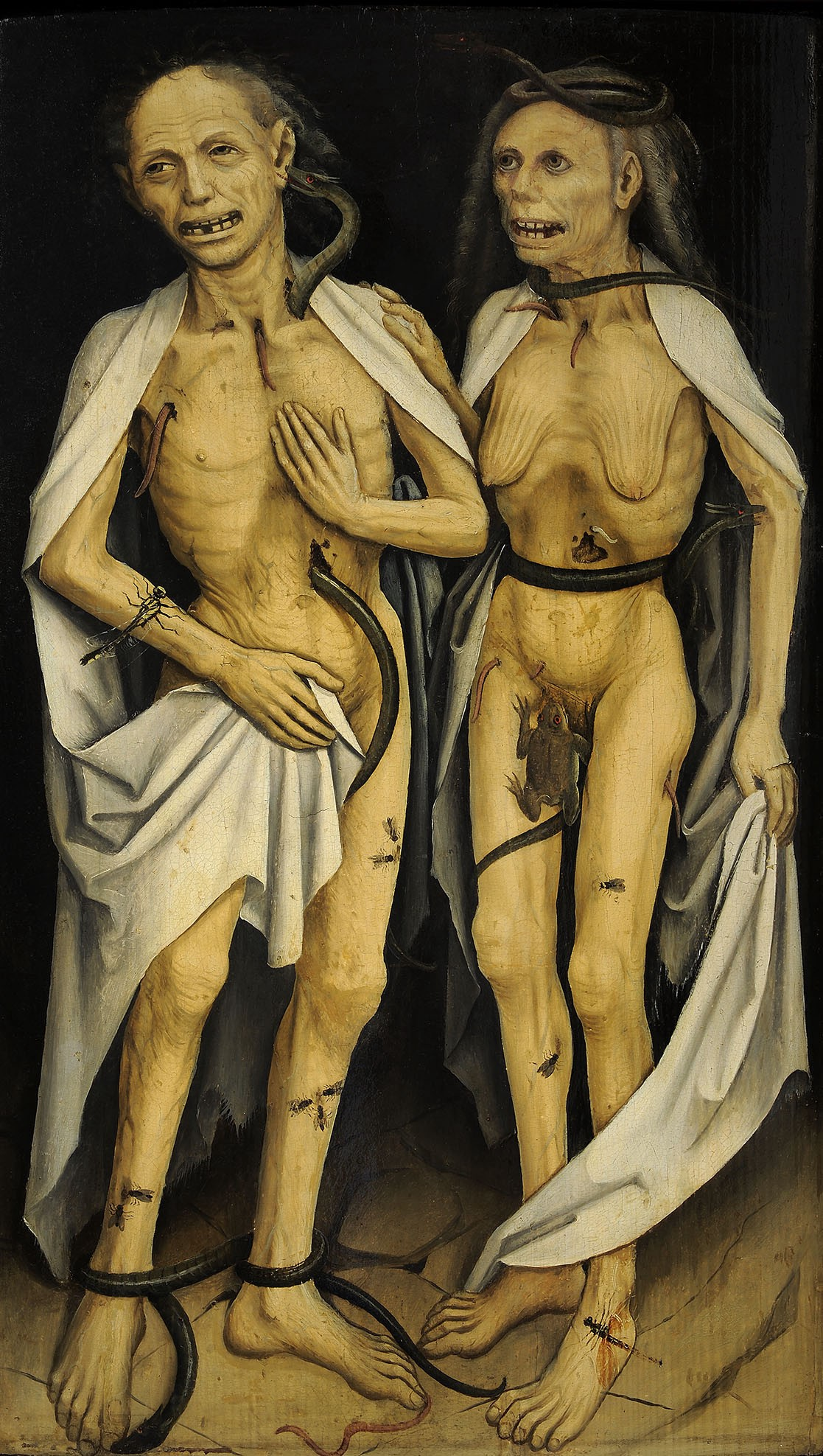
The Dead Lovers, c. 1470 (Strasbourg, Musée de l'Œuvre Notre-Dame)

In Bram Stoker's novel Dracula, Van Helsing describes the Un-Dead as the following:

‘Before we do anything, let me tell you this. It is out of the lore and experience of the ancients and of all those who have studied the powers of the UnDead. When they become such, there comes with the change the curse of immortality. They cannot die but must go on age after age adding new victims and multiplying the evils of the world. For all that die from the preying of the Undead become themselves Undead, and prey on their kind. And so the circle goes on ever widening, like as the ripples from a stone thrown in the water ... But of the most blessed of all, when this now UnDead be made to rest as true dead, then the soul of the poor lady whom we love shall again be free. Instead of working wickedness by night and growing more debased in the assimilating of it by day, she shall take her place with the other Angels. So that, my friend, it will be a blessed hand for her that shall strike the blow that sets her free.

— Van Helsing, Dr. Seward's Diary, 29 September; Dracula, Chapter 16

Other notable 19th-century stories about the avenging undead included Ambrose Bierce's The Death of Halpin Frayser, and various Gothic Romanticism tales by Edgar Allan Poe. Though their works could not be properly considered zombie fiction, the supernatural tales of Bierce and Poe would prove influential on later writers such as H. P. Lovecraft, by Lovecraft's own admission. In Russia, the undead was the theme of Alexander Belyaev's novel Professor Dowell's Head (1925), in which a mad scientist performs experimental head transplants on bodies stolen from the morgue, and reanimates the corpses.

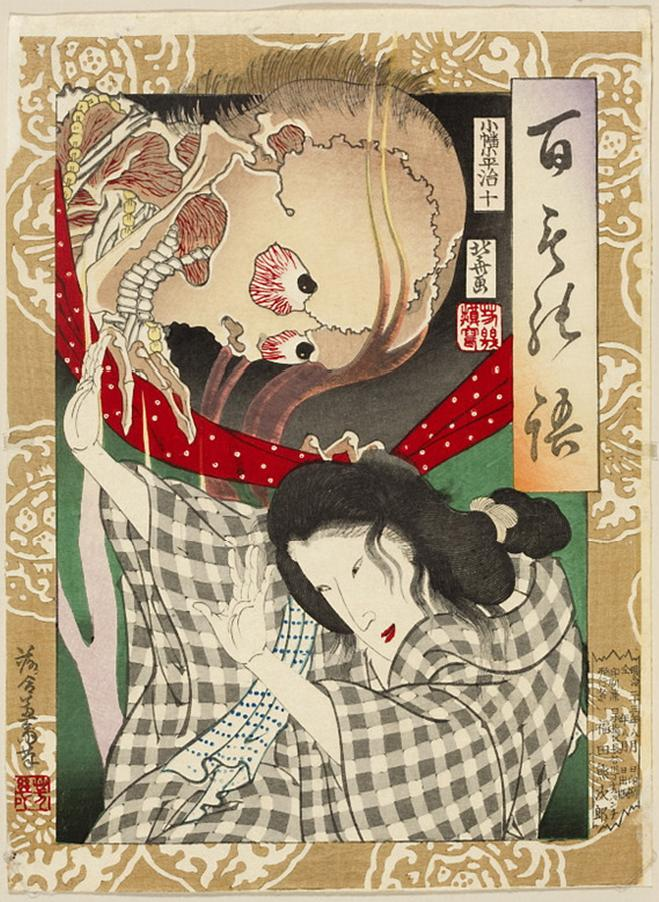
Utagawa Yoshiiku, Specter frightening a young woman

== List of undead forms ==
=== Physical corpses ===
- Ahkiyyini
- Anchimayen
- Deildegast
- Draugr
- Drekavac
- Dullahan
- Fext
- Gashadokuro
- Ghoul
- Gjenganger
- Hone-onna
- Headless Horseman
- Jiangshi
- Kukudh
- Langsuyar
- Lich
- Lugat
- Mummy
- Nachzehrer
- Orek
- Qutrub
- Revenant
- Ro-langs
- Rusalka
- Skeleton
- Strzyga
- Upiór
- Vampire / Nosferatu
- Vetala
- Vourdalak
- Vrykolakas
- Wiedergänger
- Wight
- Wendigo
- Zombie
- Zombie animal

=== Incorporeal spirits (Non-physical) ===
- Ayakashi
- Bal-Bal
- Banshee
- Baykok
- Bhoot
- Chang
- Dullahan
- Dunnie
- Dybbuk
- Funayūrei
- Ghost, phantom, or spectre
- Goryō
- The Grim Reaper
- Headless Horseman
- Hitodama
- Hortdan
- Hupia
- Ikiryō
- Inugami
- Jikininki
- Korean Virgin Ghost
- Kuntilanak
- Kuchisake-onna
- La Llorona
- Lemures
- Lietuvēns
- Mavka
- Mhachkay
- Mogwai
- Mononoke
- Moroi
- Myling
- Noppera-bō
- Onryō
- Penanggalan
- Pocong
- Poltergeist
- Pop
- Preta
- Pricolici
- Sayona
- Shade
- Shadow person
- Shikigami
- Shiryō
- Sluagh
- Strigoi
- Ubume
- Umibōzu
- Vengeful ghost
- Yuki-onna
- Yūrei
- Wraith
- Will-o'-the-wisp

=== Mixed ===
- Dying-and-rising deity

== See also ==
- Afterlife
- Grógaldr
- Immortality
- Necromancy
- Personifications of death
- Resurrection
- Spirit possession
- Soul
- The Undertaker
