= Kormos =

Spirits in Turkic mythology

Kormos or Kormoz (Tuvan: кормос; Turkish: Körmöz or Körmös) are spirits in Turkic mythology and can also refer to ghosts or demons. "Kormos" means "does not see" or "blind" in Turkic languages. The word can also mean "mentally ill".

In Turkic mythology, Kormoses are devilish entities who live in Tamag, the underworld. Since a soul can turn into a Kormos after death, they are often associated with ancestral spirits. Other names used for them are Alban, Chahik, Ozor, and more.

Angelic Kormoses, who help and protect humans are under Ülgen's command. Demonic Kormoses [also called "Sokor Körmös" (blind angel)], who commonly dwell in the underworld and harm humans, are controlled by Erlik. Remaining Kormoses are those who are not particularly good or evil and roam the Earth while suffering in a pathetic state. The idea of Körmös as a "blind angel" might have been influenced by the Islamic concepts of fallen angels.

Souls turned into Demonic Kormoses after death can escape the torment and ascend to Uçmag if the good in their core overweighs their evil.

== Features ==
They are all both good and evil spirits. Their chief is Körmös Khan. They are generally treated with a triple classification:

- Souls living on the earth.
- Souls living in underground (Tamag).
- Souls living in the sky (Uçmag).

The Kormos mostly appear at sunset and at sunrise. That is why these times are considered dangerous. People are discouraged from being awake at these times. They can capture people's souls. The concept of the blind is used for mental or mental illness. In Yakutas, the wandering souls of the dead are called Uğör (Yör). The belief that the souls of the people who died have turned into Körmös is common. Obun the souls of people who died as a result of an accident, those who committed suicide are called Alban. The souls of ancestors are called Ozor. Their leader is known as Kürmez Han. These Kormos are divided into three types:

- Arug (Arı) Körmös: Angelic Kormoses. They protect and help the humans who do good deeds. They're at Ülgens command. They try to keep the balance on earth.
- Caman (Yaman) Körmös: Demonic Kormoses. They are the servants of Erlik in Tamag. They can abduct and torture people.
- Kal (Gal) Körmös: Ghosts who are not particularly good or evil and roam the Earth while suffering in a pathetic state.

== Types of Kormos ==
=== Yör ===
They mostly live in Tamag. They are evil spirits. Sometimes they go up to earth and harm humans. They are often mentioned in the beliefs of the Yakuts.

=== Alban ===
They consist of the souls of people who have committed suicide. Their body resembles humans but unlike humans they have extremely long hair, long claws, and inverted eyes and feet.

=== Çahık ===
They are the souls of the damned. They can change forms. Their bloody hands, dry eyes and deadly talk are exceedingly dangerous.

=== Ozor ===
Expression for the ancestors' souls. They are known to come and help their descendants. Ancestors' souls have a very important place in Tengrism.
