= Mongol mythology =

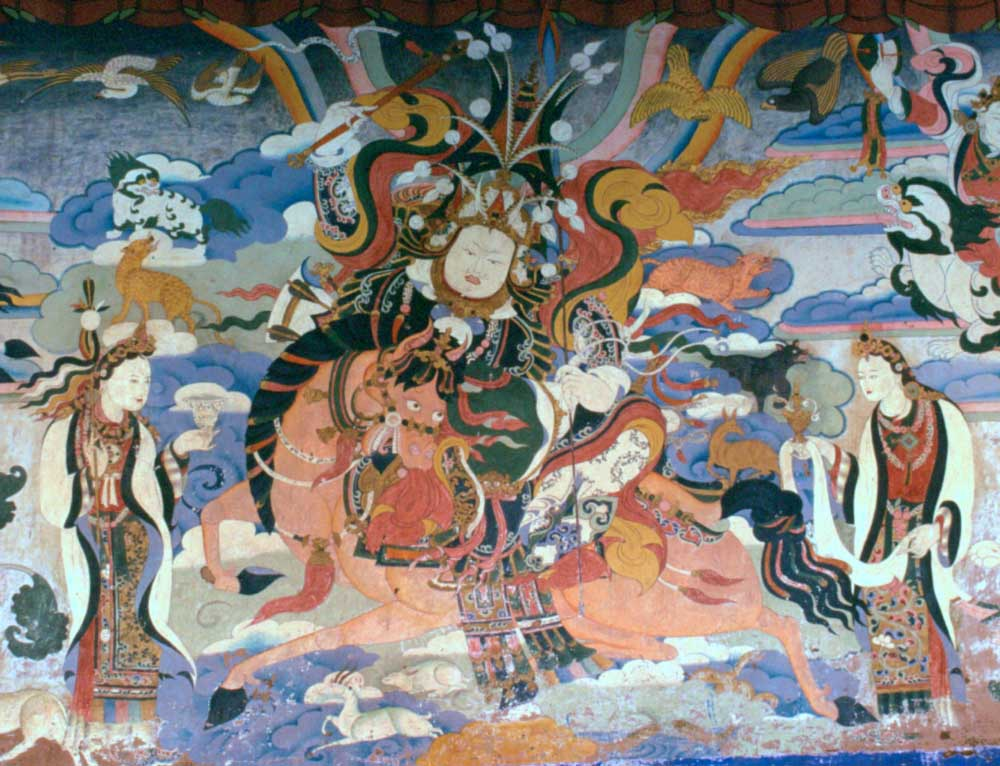
Mural depicting King Gesar of Ling

The Mongol mythology is the traditional religion of the Mongols.

== Creation ==
There are many Mongol creation myths. In one, the creation of the world is attributed to a Buddhist deity Lama. At the start of time, there was only water, and from the heavens, Lama came down to it holding an iron rod with which he began to stir. As he began to stir the water, the stirring brought about wind and fire which caused a thickening at the centre of the waters to form the earth. Another narrative also attributes the creation of heaven and earth to a lama who is called Udan. Udan began by separating earth from heaven, and then dividing heaven and earth both into nine stories, and creating nine rivers. After the creation of the earth itself, the first male and female couple were created out of clay. They would become the progenitors of all humanity.

In another example the world began as an agitating gas which grew increasingly warm and damp, precipitating a heavy rain that created the oceans. Dust and sand emerged to the surface and became earth. Yet another account tells of the Buddha Sakyamuni searching the surface of the sea for a means to create the earth and spotted a golden frog. From its east side, Buddha pierced the frog through, causing it to spin and face north. From its mouth burst fire, and its rump streamed water. Buddha tossed golden sand on his back which became land. And this was the origin of the five earthly elements, wood and metal from the arrow, and fire, water and sand. These myths date from the 17th century when Yellow Shamanism (Tibetan Buddhism using shamanistic forms) was established in Mongolia. Black Shamanism and White Shamanism from pre-Buddhist times survive only in far-northern Mongolia (around Lake Khuvsgul) and the region around Lake Baikal where Lamaist persecution had not been effective.

== Deities ==
- Bai-Ulgan and Esege Malan are creator deities.
- Ot is the goddess of marriage.
- Tung-ak is the patron god of tribal chiefs and the ruler of the lesser spirits of Mongol mythology
- Erlik Khan is the King of the Underworld.
- Daichi Tengri is the red god of war to whom enemy soldiers were sometimes sacrificed during battle campaigns.
- Zaarin Tengri is a spirit who gives Khorchi (in the Secret History of the Mongols) a vision of a cow mooing "Heaven and earth have agreed to make Temujin (later Genghis Khan) the lord of the nation".
- The sky god Tengri is attested from the Xiongnu of the 2nd century BC. The Xiongnu may have been Mongolic, because Tengri is common to several Central Asian peoples, including the Mongols
- Jamsaran is the Mongolian war god, now worshipped in Tibet as Begtse.

The wolf, falcon, deer and horse were important symbolic animals.

== Texts and myths ==
The Uliger are traditional epic tales and the Epic of King Gesar is shared with much of Central Asia and Tibet.

The Epic of King Gesar (Ges'r, Kesar) is a Mongol religious epic about Geser (also known as Buche Beligte), a prophet of Tengriism.

== See also ==
- Alpamysh
- Epic of Manas
- Manchurian mythology
- Mongolian cosmogony
- Scythian mythology
- Shamanism in Siberia
- The Secret History of the Mongols
- Tibetan mythology
- Tungusic mythology
- Turco-Mongol tradition
- Turkic mythology
