= Chai nenesi =

Turkic water spirit

Chai nenesi (Old Turkic: 𐰲𐰴𐰀𐰃:𐰤𐰤𐰾𐰃), is a name applied to Turkic spirits of water, commonly creeks. She is responsible for sucking people into swamps and lakes as well as killing the animals standing near the still waters.

She is described as a white nude female with tousled [hair] and is known to harass people and bring misfortune to drunkards. In most versions, Chai Nenesi is an unquiet being, associated with the "unclean force". She Usually comes out of the water at night to climb a tree and sing songs or sit on a dock and comb her hair.

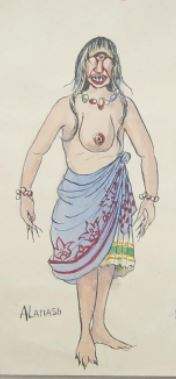
Chai nenesi by Azim Azimzade

== See also ==
- Su iyesi
