= Kubai =

Goddess of birth and children in Turkish mythology

- Goddess of Birth and Children
- Abode: Ulukayın
- Age: Middle-Aged
- Gender: Female
- Parents: Kayra (father)

Kubai (Turkish: Kübey) is the goddess of birth and children in Turkic mythology. She protects women who give birth and gives the children souls. She protects things that are pure and clean on Earth and is also seen as the goddess of cleanliness.

Kubai has a serious look and long hair, with a middle-aged appearance and she was daughter of Kayra. She brings the milk from the Sutgol in a container made of animal skin and drips it into the mouth of the newborn baby. This makes the baby want more milk and they start to move towards the outside world. She lives inside the Ulukayın tree, from which the Bengisu (Water of Life) flows. The Ulukayın tree and Kubai emit light. She is half-naked, with legs and feet resembling tree roots. She gives a healing milk from her chest. When a pregnant woman gives birth, she descends from the sky and stands beside her, but the woman cannot see her. She eases the woman's pains. She protects and educates the child. She protects and educates the child. When a child cries during a dream and sleeps restlessly, Kubai is said to have left him. On the child reaching the age of six months, a Kam (shaman) is invited for a special ceremony to Kubai-Ana (Mother Kubai). During this they ask Kubai to safeguard and protect the baby. A talisman (a small bow and arrow) is attached to the cradle, symbolising the weapon Kubai uses against malicious spirits. The complete care and the constant presence of Kubai near the child continues until he learns to walk, run, understand speech, and speak fluently. Kubai’s function is as a Goddess of reproduction. It was to her that barren couples prayed for a child. Some still believe that Kubai remains in the umbilical cord to protect the child, and umbilical cord may be buried near the hearth.
