= Esege Malan =

Mongol creator deity

- God of the Western horizon
- Ethnic group: Buryats

Genealogy
- Children: Solobung Yubin

Esege Malan (Mongolian: Эсеге Малан, Buryat: Эсэгэ, Russian: Эсэгэ Малан), according to Mongol myth and the belief of the Buryats, is the great Creator of all living things. He is a Buryat sky-god who rules over the western horizon. His son is Solobung Yubin, a spiritual morning star which, if offered sacrifices, will reward the Mongol people with greater harvest yields and prosperity.

As chief of the sky-spirits, Esege Malan calls meetings of them "in the Pleiades and on the moon".

== Creation of Earth ==
In the beginning of Universe there were only Esege Malan, the highest god. Everywhere was dark and silent. There was nothing to be seen. Esege took up a handful of earth and made the sun and moon. Then he made all plants. Esege divided the earth into East and West. Gave it to the highest order of gods.

== Esege and Mother Earth ==
After all things Mother Earth, went to visit him. They spent several days. When she was ready to go, she asked him to give her the sun and the moon. But he soon found that it was very difficult to get them for her. Then Esege Malan sent for the hedgehog Esh. It went up to the Tenger (sky) to the dwelling of Esege Malan.
