= Uylak =

Witch or spirit in Turkic mythology

Uylak in Turkic folklore is a male or female witch or spirit.

Uylak are thought to be evil beings connected to the Devil. They are capable of harming humans by sending illnesses, killing cattles, spoiling harvests, etc. Uylaks are capable of shapeshifting into various animals and objects; like hounds, cats, coffins, and sometimes even humans. They are also resistant to Archura's enchantments.

Uylaks pester and scare people on desolate roads they infested.

The word can also be used as an insult.

The term Uylak comes from the Turkish verb Uylamak (means to insist, to urge, to pester) and Oyalamak (to delay). The term Uylak can be translated as "diversionary" in English.

== See also ==
- List of Turkic mythological figures
