= Aisyt =

Yakut goddess of birth, newborns, and fate

- Goddess of childbirth and fate
- Other names: Ajyyhyt, Aysyt, Ajsyt, Ajyhyt
- Region: Lena River region of Siberia
- Ethnic group: Yakut people
- Parents: Yer Tanrı

Ajyyhyt (Aysyt, Ajsyt or Ajyhyt; Yakut: Айыыһыт, romanized: Ayııhıt; Turkish: Ayzıt) is a Turkic goddess of the Yakut people from the Lena River region of Siberia and is an important figure in Turkic mythology. The name means "birthgiver" and she may also be called the "mother of cradles". Her full name is given as Айыыһыт Хотун, meaning "birth-giving nourishing mother". Aisyt brings the soul from heaven at the birth of a baby and records each one in the Golden Book of Fate. She is the daughter of Yer Tanrı.

== Role ==
Ajysyt was responsible for conducting the soul of a newborn child to its birth and attended every birth. Women would channel Ajysyt, believing that doing so would relieve them of pain during childbirth. She kept a golden book in which she recorded each one. She is said to have lived on a mountain top in a house with seven stories, from which she controlled the fate of the world.

== Versions ==
The Yakut revere a variety of ayıı (Yakut: Айыы). The primary manifestation, Ņelbey Ayııhıt (Yakut: Ньэлбэй Айыыһыт), is responsible for the birth of children. Cöhögöy Toyon (Yakut: Дьөһөгөй Тойон) governs the reproduction of horses, İhegey İeyiexsit (Yakut: Иhэгэй Иэйиэхсит) is responsible for oxen, and Noruluya manages dogs and foxes.

When referring to the deity for the births of male animals, such as stallions or bulls, the word ayııhıt is understood to be male. However, when relating to the birth of a mare or cow, the word is feminine.

== Legends ==
One legend recalls how she appeared from the roots of the cosmic tree (alternatively the world pillar of Ürüñ Aar Toyon (Yakut: Үрүҥ Аар Тойон) to a pale young man; the tree stood beside a lake of milk. By suckling the youth she caused his strength to increase a hundredfold.

== Contemporary representation ==
Ajysyt is a featured figure on Judy Chicago's installation piece The Dinner Party, being represented as one of the 999 names on the Heritage Floor.
