= Mergens =

Mergens is a surname. Notable people with the surname include:

- Bridget Mergens (fl. 1989–1990), petitioner in US court case Westside Community Board of Education v. Mergens
- Celeste Mergens (fl. 2008), founder of Days for Girls

== See also ==
- Mergen
