= Ergene iyesi =

In Turkic folklore, Ergene iyesi (Turkish: Ergene iyesi, Azerbaijani: Ərgənə iyesi) is an underground spirit. It is the protector spirit of mine pit, and can turn into an animal. The word "İye" means owner, master or possessor. Also known as Shakhta iyesi (Tatar: Şahta İyäse; "Protector of Mine-pit").

== Features ==
Ergene iyesi or Shakhta iyesi in Turkic and Tatar mythologies live in mines and underground workings and are the guardians of gems, crystals, and precious metals. It is said, that they will protect miners from danger, and lead them back when they are lost. Then, he alerts te miners against dent with the cat sound tone or whistling. They will also lead them to veins of ore. To people who are evil or insult them they are deadly; pushing them into dark chasms or send tunnels crashing down upon them. Hurling rocks, whistling or covering one’s head are actions that are offensive to the Ergene iyesi; who will warn the offender with handfuls of pelted soil in their direction before taking serious action.

=== Shakhta Ata ===
Shakhta Ata or Shahta Baba (Tatar: Şahta Ata; Uzbek: Shaxta Ota, "Father of Pit") is male form and akin of Ergene iyesi. The word Şahta / Şaxta (Russian: Шахта, German: Schacht) means mine pit in Turkic and Slavic languages. Shakhta Ata is said to appear as an old man with a torch in his hand. The person with this name is in Azerbaijan culture Shakhta Baba (Azerbaijani: Şaxta Baba), that appears as the god of winter. Sometimes he is an old man like Santa Claus or Russian Ded Moroz. But in any case it is a helpful entity.

== Sources ==
- Tatar Türklerinde Varlıklar, Çulpan Zaripova - (Şahta İyäse, Maden Ocağı İyesi)
