= Uçmag =

Name of heaven in Tengrism

Uçmag (also spelled: Uçmag, Uçmak, Ocmah, Uçmah) is heaven in Turkic mythology. It is the opposite of Tamag. The souls of the righteous people dwell in heaven after death.

== Etymology ==
Since the soul reaches heaven by flying up to it, for example by taking the appearance of a bird or carried by a spirit sent by Ülgen, will be carried to heaven after death, heaven carries a connotation of flying. Since the Turkic word for flight (uç) combined with the infinitive verbal suffix -mak means to take flight, from the eleventh century onwards, this word served to designate this particular region of the afterlife. However, another possibility is Sogdian word 'wshtm'x' (paradise).

== Description ==
In Tengrism, heaven resembles the earth, but as undefiled by humans with an untouched nature. It is much brighter than the earth there and the natives of this world have never deviated from the traditions of their ancestors. Shamans can visit this place in their rituals.
