= Ay Ata =

Father Moon of Turkic mythology

Ay Ata, Ay Dede
- Moon
- Abode: 6th floor in the Sky
- Symbol: Moon

Genealogy
- Parents: Kayra and Yer Tanrı
- Siblings: Umay; Ülgen; Erlik; Koyash; Gun Ana
- Consort: Gun Ana

Ay Ata (Old Turkic: 𐰖:𐱃𐰀), also known as Ay Dede, is one of the mythological entities in Turkic mythology and Tengrism. Ay Ata literally means Moon Father.

== Description ==
According to the mythology, he is a moon god, and he has been living in sixth floor of the sky with Kun Ana, the sun goddess, who he is coupled with. While Kün Ana is symbol of warmness and hotness, Ay Dede is the symbol of cold.

In Turkey, he is well known in modern times, Ay Dede is popular amongst children due to tales being told about him. The mythology is more common amongst Siberian Turks, such as Altaians and Yakuts, who still have populations who actively practice Tengrism.

Notably, in the Epic of Oghuz Khan, Ay Tanrı also is mentioned as the father of Oghuz Khan, even though that part remains somewhat unclear. It's also notable Oghuz Khan's second son was named Ayhan (Ay Khan, "moon khan").

== Aisar ==
From ancient times, the Turkic people believed that humans had secret lunar powers (Aisar or Aysar). Female pregnancy lasts about nine lunar months, and women often deliver during a full moon.

The three phases of the moon were also symbolic. It was believed that at "Ai Naazy" (new moon) the Moon symbolized a growing child who is pure and modest. At "Ai Toly" (full moon), the Moon personified a mature good-natured mother or father. At "Ai Karty" (old moon) the moon aged became wise. But at the same time quarrelsome and malicious. Before its death, the moon reigned over a totally dark night. The forces of life and death met during these nights. After the meeting they separated, only to meet again after a defined period. When the old moon died, a new one was born, and so on, ad infinitum.

The Turkic people trusted the magic influence of the Moon. He was their sole "night lantern". The celebrations of malicious spirits occurred mostly at night. The rituals and trances of witches and demons were always timed according to the phases of the Moon. In Turkish culture illnesses were expected to worsen at night, and cause more deaths. To please the Moon God, those born during a full moon were given names as such: Aisylu (Aysulu), Aituly (Aytulu), Ainir (Aynur), Aizirek (Ayzerek), and Ainaz (Aynaz).

== See also ==
- List of lunar deities

== Legends of Ay Dede ==
- Ay Dede and Orphan Girl
- Ay Dede and Seven Head-Giant War
- Ay Dede and Wolves
- Legends of Children Whose Father is the Moon

== Sources ==
- Türk Mitolojisi, Murat Uraz
- Bahaeddin Ögel, Türk Mitolojisi (Vol-1, Page 132)
