= Kyzaghan =

Turkic war deity

Kyzaghan (Old Turkic: 𐰶𐰃𐰔𐰍𐰣) also known as Kyzaghan Han (Turkish: Kızagan Han) is a Turkic deity of war.

Kyzaghan is often depicted with a sword or bow in one hand and a horn in the other. His wand is the rainbow. Other important symbols included the red horse and red color. He is associated with war and depicted as a strong and powerful god. He assists commanders in leading armies, winning wars, and defeating the enemy. He protects warriors, makes them strong and invincible. Kyzaghan is the son of Kayra and the brother of Ulgan. He lives on the ninth floor of sky. He was portrayed as a young man with a helmet and a spear, riding on a red horse.

== Etymology ==
The word Kyzaghan (Kızağan) means angry or fierce in Turkic languages. The root word is “Kız", meaning red and anger.
