= Muu shuvuu =

Mythological bird

Muu shuvuu (Oirat: му шовун, romanized: mu şovun; Buryat: муу шубуун, romanized: muu šubuun; Mongolian: муу шувуу; (Note: Mongolian script: ᠮᠠᠭᠤ ᠰᠢᠪᠠᠭᠤ) lit. 'harmful bird'; also romanized as mu shuvuu, muu shuwuu, moh shuvuu, muu shovun, or mu shubuun) is a mythological bird in Turkic and, Mongolic mythology. They would look like young girls but have a sharp beak, which they try to cover either in a veil or with their hands. With their beaks, they would try to suck out the blood of the bodies of their victims. They were especially dangerous to travellers or lonely hunters. Muu shuvuu is believed to be usually created when a girl dies young or by violent death. The girl's soul would turn into a muu shuvuu then. When a father hides a flint in his deceased daughters hand, however, he would turn her soul into one as well.
