= Ev iyesi =

Religion

Ev iyesi (Old Turkic: 𐰅𐰋 𐰄𐰖𐰅𐰽𐰄, "House Guard") is a household spirit in Turkic mythology. Also known as Uy (Oy) iyesi or Yurt iyesi. Ev iyesi is a deity or spirit that protects the home, looking after the entire household or certain key members.

== Meaning of iye ==
Ev İyesi is a house spirit in Turkish / Turkic folklore. Usually İye has the meaning of "familiar spirit". He is masculine, typically small and bearded. He takes on the appearance of current or former owners of the house and have a grey beard. In Anatolia, he is known as Sahab or Kimsene.

=== In Turkish Folklore ===
Traditionally, every house is said to have its İye. The word "İye" means owner, master, possessor, etc. It does not do evil unless angered by a family's poor keep of the household, profane language or neglect. He is seen as the home's guardian, and he sometimes helps with household chores and field work. Some even treat them as part of the family, albeit an unseen one, and leave them gifts like milk in the kitchen overnight. It is said the favorite place for these spirits to live is either the threshold under the door or under the stove. The center of the house is also said to be their domain or in the basement. Ev İyesi maintains peace and order, and rewards a well-maintained household. Some peasants feed him nightly in return for protection of their house. When a new house was built, Anatolian people would attract the İye to take to the new house.

== Similar creatures ==
1. Eşik iyesi or Astana iyesi (Spirit of doorstep) is some kind of Ev iyesi. Even they are synonymous. It lives on the threshold (doorstone) of the house.
2. Mutfak iyesi or Aşlık İyesi lives in kitchen.
3. Evlik İyesi or Ambar İyesi is the protector spirit of cellar or larder.

== See also ==
- Domovoi
- Tomte

== Bibliography ==
- Türk Mitolojisi Ansiklopedik Sözlük, Celal Beydili, Yurt Yayınevi (in Turkish)
- Bayazitova, Flöra (1995), Tatar Halqınıñ Bäyräm Häm Könküreş Yolaları, Qazan: Tatarstan Kitap Näşriyatı (in Tatar)
