= Ulukayın =

Tree of Life in Turkic mythology

Ulukayın is the Tree of Life in Turkic mythology, folk belief and shamanism. It is the tree of life that connects the earth and the sky.

== Its meaning and importance ==
It was erected by Kayra. It was created with the world. It is in the very center of the Earth, underground and sky. Its branches hold up the sky. Its roots pierce all layers of the Earth and extend into the subterranean ocean. The Öksökö bird spins around and flies, sometimes landing on its top. The nine tribes (nine tribes of the Turks or the nine great human races on Earth) are derived from the nine branches of this tree. Umay Ana is the owner of the Tree of Life and uses this tree while descending to the Earth. Kübey Hanım lives in this tree. Its roots go underground and its branches reach the sky. From its roots flows the water of life (Bengüsu). Each branch is described as having seventy leaves of gold. Its leaves are the size of a horse's skin. It has a very important place in Turkish mythology. It pierces the skies and rises to unknown heights. One of Ulukayın's branches extends to the Sun and the other to the Moon. Ülgen sits on its hill. It is sometimes considered a pine tree. There is the Moon on one side of the tree and the Sun on the other. Sometimes it is accepted that Demirdağ stood on it. Eight shadows are referred to as nine roots. People's souls fly between the branches of this tree. These spirits are like little birds. The tree that Osman I, the founder of the Ottomans, saw in his dream and that would grow and cover the whole world, resembles Ulukayın. Making a wish by tying cloth (ragut) to the tree also seems to be related to Ulukayın. Its resin, called ilge, gives great power to those who eat it. With the influence of Manichaeism, the Tree of Death, which is the opposite of the Tree of Life, also entered Turkish culture, but it did not become widespread. It is sometimes referred to as two trees from the same root, which is also appropriate with its two peaks, Mount World.

== Çalama ==
Çalama means tying a rag to an object or entity that is considered sacred in Turkish folk belief. It is the application of tying cloth and rag to trees. The action taken is called Çalama. Ulukayın is related to his faith. The word leavening is expressed with the verb to steal in Turkish. In this context, it can be perceived as the fermentation of a thought, a wish to a holy place. The tying of ribbons to sacrificial rams is also related to this understanding. It is also used with the verb to steal (to tie rags). One of the meanings of the word stealing is to cut the fabric. It may also be related to the concept of Yal/Al.

== Turuğ ==
Turuğ is the tree for Shamans in folklore. When Qurmusta Tengri created the first shaman, he planted an eight-branched tree in front of his house. That's why every shaman plants a tree that represents him. This tree is called "Turuğ". Turug literally means durable, standing in place, immortal. The words Tör / Törü / Türe / Törö / Turo / Turu contain the meanings of order, order, as well as marriage and birth in folk belief.

== Serge ==
Serge, holy pole in Turkic folk culture and mythology. Also called Sergey or Sergen. A pole for tying horses. It is believed that this pillar has its guardian spirit (iye). Apart from the general exhibitions, there are special Horse Exhibitions erected in the courtyard. Only the bride's horse can be tied to the Kiyi Serge / Bride Sergeni. In addition, there are special exhibitions erected on great holidays. There are also three or nine exhibitions in order to receive the spiritual support of the spirits of the earth and water. There is also a serge erected for cows, and a horse is not tied to it. Serges are decorated with trees and ornaments made of manes. A wooden horse head symbol is placed on the head of the sergeant. In some tales, the underground is equated with the Golden Pillar that connects the Earth and the sky. It represents wealth, prestige and power. Heroes connect his horse to the ground part, Erlik to the underground part, and Ülgen to the sky part. The word is connected with the word Pole. It comes from the verb to lay.

== See also ==
- World tree
