= Alaz =

God of fire in Turkic mythology

Alaz is the god of fire in Turkic mythology. Also known as Alas-Batyr or sometimes Alaz Khan. He is an important deity in folk beliefs and son of Kayra.

== Description ==
Alaz Khan is depicted as an old man with a torch in his hand. He lives in Ulugh Od (Turkish; Uluğ Od, means “Great Fire”). His dress is made of flames and Alaz Khan has the power of fire. If he becomes angry, Alaz Khan makes and causes fires on the earth. All of the hearths and stoves are in the command of Alaz Khan. He sends spirits to all hearths. Every fire or hearth has an İye (protector spirit or deity). The Turkic concept of the god seems to associate him both to the destructive and the purifying powers of fire.

== Fire worship in Turkish culture ==
According to ancient Turkic traditions and opinions, fire is a sacred phenomenon and can purify all things, even spirits or souls. People are obliged to respect the fire in family or in social life. The belief indicates that inside of fire lives a protector spirit (familiar spirit). If it was angry, then it can be harmful to humans. Because of this disrespectful behavior, fire may be extinguished. Therefore, Tengrist traditional, oral narratives told horrible stories of irreverence to fire. The Great Law of Genghis Khan (Dead Law) had serious penalties for anyone that showed disrespect to fire.

== Etymology ==
The origin of the name is very clear. The word Alaz (or Yalaz) means fire or flame in Turkic languages. The root of word is “Al”. Turkish tradition maintained that it was related to Sogdian words connected to blaze (Alaw, Alav, Alev), which in turn was thought of as related to flames.

== Other names of Fire God ==
All of these names refers to fire or flame: Yalın (Yalgın, Yalkın), Andar (Andır), Cahın (Çahın, Çakın), Gal (Qal, Xal), Kalçan, Sahaday.
