= Chesma iyesi =

In Turkic mythology, Chesma İyasi (Turkish: Çeşme İyesi or Bulak İyesi or Pınar İyesi) was a cat-shaped spirit who lurked in wells or fountains and tempted youths to their deaths. As a female spirit that resides in water, she can be seen as a type of naiad.

Chesma İyasi were seen as dangerous due to their jealous tendencies. They were said to assume many different shapes, including that of a human, fish or fairy. Their usual form is that of a beautiful woman with the tail of a fish. When they are in human form, they can be recognised by the wet hem of their clothes.

Kuyu İyesi is a type of Çeşme İyesi. Unlike the Çeşme İyesi, they are benevolent spirits who protect the wells in which they make their homes.

== See also ==
- Mermaid
- Nymph
- List of Turkic mythological figures
