= Irshi =

Mythical being in Turkic folklore

In Turkic folklore, an Irshi (Turkish: İrşi) is a type of mythical being or legendary fairy-like creature which is in a form of a spirit, often described as supernatural or preternatural.

== Characteristics ==
Irshi is generally described as human (beautiful girl) appearance and having magical powers. Although they are often depicted as young, sometimes winged, tall, radiant, angelic spirits. Irshi is a beautiful, supernatural female being. She is depicted as kind, gentle and sweet. They are youthful and elegant, and superb in the art of dancing. Irshi cannot lie. Various animals have also been described as Irshi. Sometimes this is the result of shape shifting on part of this fairies.

=== Irshi as an evil spirit ===
In folklore, they are variously regarded as a "natural" but hidden species, as spirits of the dead, or as descendants of either fallen angels, or demons. In many legends, the Irshi is prone to kidnapping humans, either as babies, leaving changelings in their place, or as young men and women. This can be for a time or forever, and may be more or less dangerous to the kidnapped. They appear only at night or in the evening. In Turkic folklore they have fiery eyes.

=== Irshi as a benevolent spirit ===
In some tales, an Irshi is a fairy with magical powers who acts as a mentor to someone. Typically, Irshi protects a Tigin (prince) or Begüm (princess) and the hero of the story, and Irsnhi uses her magic to help or otherwise support them.

== See also ==
- Fairy
- Peri
