= İn Cin =

Turkish phrase

İn Cin (also: İn jinn) is a Turkish phrase used to express that a place is entirely abandoned.

== Background ==
According to Turkish beliefs, İn and jinn inhabit forgotten or desolated places. Therefore, a place visited by such beings, as for example in "İn cin top oynamak" ("İn and jinn play ball"), means that this place must be completely devoid of human life.

The combination of these two entities bears resemblance to the Quranic phrase al-ins wa al-jinn (الإِنسِ وَالْجِنِّ). However, whereas in Arabic the term al-ins (الإِنسِ) refers to mankind, the similar Turkish term (İn) refers to a being similar to the jinn (human means insan in Turkish). The İn would be less predictable in behavior and more prone to chaos than the jinn.

The jinn entered the Turkish consciousness through Islam. The İn refers to a type of demon from Turkish legends. İn might root in the concept of Turkic master spirits (İye). In many Turkish tales, people are afraid or even killed by the İn and jinn when visiting haunted places.

== See also ==
- Div
- Peri
