= Yada Tashy =

Yada Tashy (Turkish: Yada Taşı; Azeri: Yada Daşı, Kazakh: Жай Тасы, Kyrgyz: Жай Ташы, Bashkir: Йәй Ташы, means "Originator Stone" or "Rain Stone"; Arabic: حجر المطر, Hajaru-l-Matar; Persian: سنگ یده, Sang-i-Yada) is a legendary folkloric substance said to be capable of summoning rain. For many centuries, it was the single most sought-after item in Turkic folk legends. Yada Tashy was a central symbol to the mystical terminology in Turkic mythology, symbolizing interference to and control over natural phenomena.

== Yadachy ==
Yadachy (Turkish: Yadacı/Yadaçı) in Turkic tradition, were men believed to have an inborn supernatural ability to protect their estate, village, or region against destructive weather conditions, such as storms, hail, or torrential rains. It was believed that the souls of these men could leave their bodies in sleep, to intercept and fight with demonic beings imagined as bringers of bad weather. Having defeated the demons and taken away the stormy clouds they brought, the protectors would return into their bodies and wake up tired.

Yadachy of an area usually fought together against the attacking Yadachy of another area who were bringing a storm and hail clouds above their fields. The victorious Yadachy would loot the yield of all agricultural produce from the territory of their defeated foes, and take it to their own region. Although Yadachy could be women and children, most were adult men. Their supernatural power was thought to be inborn. In many regions it was regarded that the Yadachy were born with a caul—white or red, depending on the regional belief. The mother would dry the caul and sew into a piece of garment always worn by the child, such as a pouch attached under the child's armpit. Adverse weather such as a storm or hail could devastate crop fields and orchards, and thus jeopardize the livelihood of farmers in the affected area. A role of Yadachy, according to folk tradition, was to lead storms and hail clouds away from their family estates, villages, or regions, to save their crops. A Yadachy could take the storms and hail clouds over the territory of another Yadachy to destroy its crops. The other Yadachy would fly up to confront the bringer of bad weather, and there would be a fight between the Yadachy.

== Neighboring cultures ==
Zduhać (Cyrillic: Здухаћ) in Serbian and Bulgarian, Macedonian, and Serbian traditions, was a person believed to have an ability to protect their village against destructive weather conditions. In Montenegro, eastern Herzegovina, part of Bosnia, and the Sandžak region of south-western Serbia, a man who was thought to be able to protect his estate, village, or region from bad weather was called a Zduhać or a stuha. According to philologist Franz Miklosich, the Serbian word stuhać is cognate with the Old Slavonic stuhia (стѹхїа) or stihia (стихїа) "the elements". According to linguists Petar Skok and Norbert Jokl, stuhać stems from the Albanian stuhi "storm". In any case, the form Zduhać may have resulted from folk etymology through association with the Serbian duh "spirit".

== Bibliography ==
- Divânu Lügati't-Türk - Mahmud ibn Hussayn ibn Muhammad al-Kashgari
