= Gun Ana =

Turkic solar deity

- Goddess of the Sun, Life, Fertility, Warmth and Health
- Abode: 7th floor of the Sky
- Symbols: Sun, Khatun
- Gender: Female
- Ethnic group: Turkic peoples
- Consort: Ay Ata

Equivalents
- Canaanite: Shapash
- Hindu: Surya

Gun Ana (Old Turkic: 𐰚𐰇𐰤:𐰣𐰀, Turkish: Gün Ana, Azerbaijani: Gün Ana, Kyrgyz: Күн Эне, Kazakh: Күн Ана, Hungarian: Nap Anya, Sakha: Күн Ий̃э, Balkar: Кюн Ана, sometimes called Yaşık Ana) is the common Turkic solar deity, treated as a goddess in the Kazakh and Kyrgyz mythologies. Gün Ana or Kün Ana means "Sun Mother" in Turkic languages.

== Background ==
Gün Ana is one of the most powerful deities, the goddess of life and fertility, warmth and health. She is patroness of the unfortunate, especially orphans. She lives on the seventh floor of the sky. Tengri created the Earth with rays of sun light, thus, Gün Ana took part in the creation of Earth. Solar rays are also considered to be "strings" between the Sun and the spirits of plants, animals and humans. Turks who worship Gün Ana turn towards the sunrise when praying.

== References in literature ==
Gün Ana is mentioned in one of the earliest written sources on Turkic mythology. According to Turkic traditions, the powerful god Kayra made the Sun and threw it into the sky. Gün Ana and Ay Ata (the Moon) were wife and husband.

According to Turkic Mythology, Khagan and his wife are supposed to be the children of the sky and the Yer (Land). Ay Ata (living in the sixth floor) and Gün Ana (living in the seventh floor) are their representatives in the sky.

The feast for Gün Ana is celebrated during the summer solstice in Northern Hemisphere on each 21 June.

== See also ==
- List of solar deities

== Bibliography ==
- Türk Mitolojisi, Murat Uraz, 2001, OCLC 245853289 (1994)
- Ziya Gökalp, Türk Medeniyeti Tarihi II, İstanbul, 1974, s. 211.
