= Sophie Mergen =

- Education: Saint-Louis University, UCLouvain,
- Occupation: Journalist
- Years active: Since 2015
- Known for: Winner of the Belgodyssée in 2015

Sophie Mergen is a French language radio and television journalist for RTBF. She specializes in health-related topics and human interest stories for the network.

== History ==
Originally from Schaerbeek, she is a graduate of the School of Journalism at UCLouvain (l’EjL), after earning her baccalaureate in information and communications from Saint-Louis University. She has worked for RTBF since September 2015, doing an internship with the network before becoming a full-time reporter.

The young woman made herself known by being laureate of the Belgodyssée in 2015. A magazine interview explains that winning will help her develop her network and her interview skills while giving her expertise needed to enter a master class in journalism. It also helps bridge the divide between linguistic communities in Belgium.

In 2019 she gave an interview with a hearing impaired person in sign language (which she does not speak), by recording the interview with her smartphone and then having it translated by the Fédération francophone des sourds de Belgique (Francophone Federation of Deaf Belgians), which was also covered as a news story by the network, detailing the process she took.
