= Zombie animal =

Animal that becomes a zombie in the zombie fiction genre

In fiction, a zombie animal is a non-human creature that becomes a zombie. Domesticated animal species have most frequently been depicted in this role: A zombie dog appeared in the film The Last Man on Earth in 1964, and an infected dog is the source of the zombie virus in REC (2007). Night of the Zombies (1981) features a scare from a zombie cat, as does Scouts Guide to the Zombie Apocalypse. A jump scare scene featuring zombie dogs in the first Resident Evil is considered to be a seminal horror scene in video game history.

== In real life ==
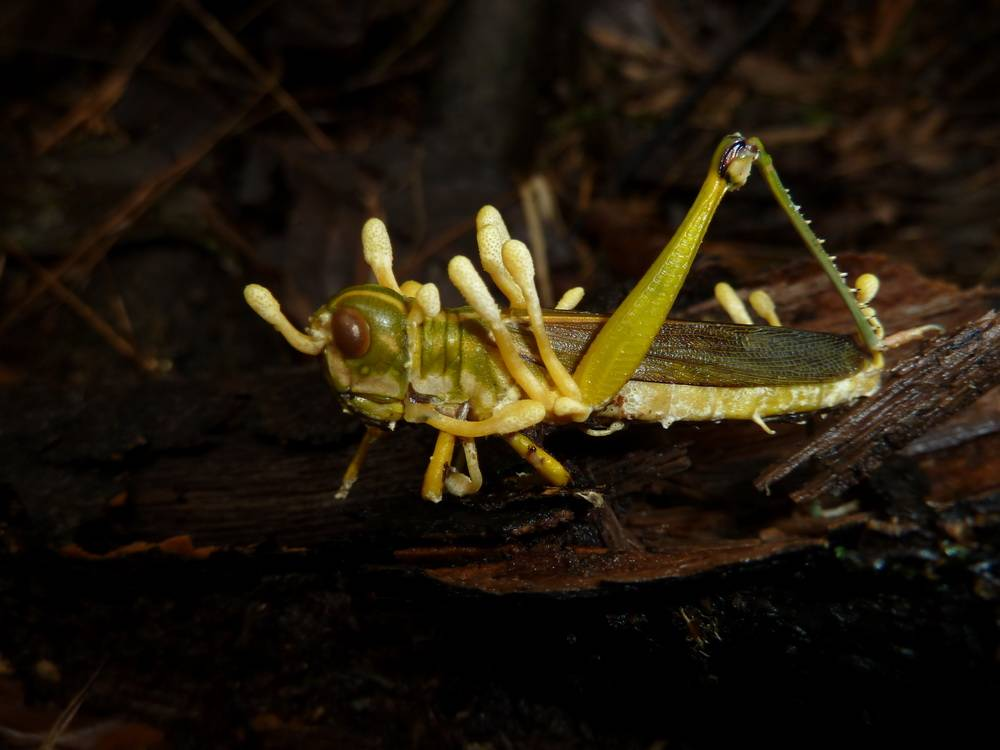
An orthopteran infected by Cordyceps locustiphila

While predominantly a fictional concept when applied to larger mammals, the term zombie is sometimes used in biology in reference to certain diseases in animals. Arthropods infected by species of entomopathogenic fungi, such as those in the genera Cordyceps and Ophiocordyceps, have their bodies taken over and their tissues are eventually replaced, leading to them being described as zombies. The Cordyceps fungus served as the primary inspiration for the zombies in The Last of Us franchise. Similarly, the Ophiocordyceps unilateralis fungus inspired the zombies in the novel The Girl with All the Gifts and its film adaptation.

Deer infected with chronic wasting disease, a type of transmissible spongiform encephalopathy, exhibit zombie-like symptoms, which has caused the disease to be known as "zombie deer disease".

== See also ==
- Zombie apocalypse
