= Su iyesi =

Water spirit in Turkic mythology

In Turkic folklore, Su Iyesi (Tatar: Су Иясе or Tatar: Su İyäse; Chuvash: Шыв Ийӗ; Yakut: Уу Иччи; literally "water master") is a water spirit. It corresponds to the nymph in Turkic cultures. It is a disembodied, incorporeal, intangible entity, but can turn into a male as well as a female creature who is the daughter of Yer Tanrı. Sometimes the master of water is depicted in the form of a bull.

== Features ==
When angered, it breaks dams, washes away water mills, and drowns people and animals. It drags people down to her underwater dwelling to serve her as slaves. It is in Tatar fairy tales the same creature as the Su Anası ("water mother"). In Turkic tales, it lives in ponds or rivers. There is no mention of a particular dwelling, and the 'half-sunken log' is unapparent. It rides on a log to travel.

Su Iyesi is sometimes associated with perilous events such as floods, storms, shipwrecks and drownings. In other Turkic folk traditions, she can be benevolent or beneficent and also cause rain.

It is believed that some powerful Su Iye, such as Su Dedesi can cause sickness. A disease called Water Disease, allegedly caused by him, appears as watery bubbles in the body of human. To get rid of it, people would throw salt into rivers or fountains.

=== Su Ana ===
Su Ana ("water mother") is often mentioned as the female form of Su Iyesi. She is said to appear as a naked young woman with a fairy-like face and yellow and long hair, usually covered in black fish scales. She has a fish's tail and eyes that burn like fire. She usually rides along her river on a half-sunken log, making loud splashes. Local drownings are said to be the work of the Su Anası. She is the wife of Su Ata. She likes shores and likes to get out of the water.

==== In Turkic languages ====
- Tuvan: Суг Ава
- Uzbek: Suv Ona or Suw Ona
- Tatar: Су Әни or Су Ана or Su Ana
- Azerbaijani: Su Ana
- Kazakh: Су Ана
- Chuvash: Шыв Анне or Шу Абай
- Bashkir: Һыу Апай
- Sakha: Уу Ий̃э
- Turkmen: Suw Ene or Suv Eje
- Uyghur: سۇ ئانا
- Turkish: Su Ana
- Kyrgyz: Суу Эне
- Altai: Суу Эне
- Khakas: Суғ Ине or Суғ Иӌе
- Karachay-Balkar: Суу Ана
- Gagauz: Su Ana

Its name in Hungarian culture is Víz Anya and in Mongolian belief is Ус Ээж (Buryat: Уһан Эхэ; Oirat: Усн Эк). These entities have many similarities, and each name has the same meaning, "aqua mother".

=== Su Ata ===
Su Ata ("water father") is the male form of Su Iyesi. He appears as an old man with a frog-like face, greenish beard, with his body covered in algae and muck. He has webbed paws instead of hands. He usually rides along his river. Consequently, he is often dubbed Vudaş (Chuvash: Вутăш, Vutăş) by the Chuvash people. He is a river and lake spirit. When someone has drowned, people often say "Su Ata took him." He also reportedly hates people who pollute the waters. The advice on how to please him goes that one should throw a whole bread into the water to make him happy. Also, when a bride must go far away, she has to be introduced to Su Ata. He usually appears in winter.

==== In Turkic languages ====
- Tuvan: Суг Ата
- Uzbek: Suv Ota or Suw Ota
- Tatar: Су Әти / Ата or Su Ata
- Azerbaijani: Su Ata
- Kazakh: Су Ата
- Chuvash: Шыв Атте or Шу Ашшӗ
- Bashkir: Һыу Атай
- Yakut: Уу Аҕа
- Turkmen: Suw Ata or Suv Ata
- Uyghur: سۇ ئاتا
- Turkish: Su Ata
- Kyrgyz: Суу Ата
- Altai: Суу Ада
- Khakas: Суғ Аба or Суғ Ада
- Karachay-Balkar: Суу Ата
- Gagauz: Su Ata

Its name in Hungarian culture is Víz Atya or Víz Apa and in Mongolian belief is Ус Эцэг (Buryat: Уһан Эсэгэ; Oirat: Усн эцк). These entities have many similarities, and each has the same meaning, "water father".

== Similar creatures ==
- Irmak iyesi or Öğüz (Öz) iyesi is river spirit. It is one kind of Su Iyesi.
- Çay iyesi or Dere iyesi is spirit of creeks and rivulets. In Azerbaijani folklore, it is known as çay nənəsi ("creek grandmother").
- Göl iyesi is a lake spirit.

== See also ==
- Vodyanoy

== Bibliography ==
- Eski Türk Kitabelerindeki Yer-Sub Meselesi, M.A.Sayidov, Translated to Turkish: S. Gömeç (in Turkish)
