= Ukulan-tojon =

Water god in Turkic mythology

Ukulan-tojon, also known as Su Ata, Ed'uget-tojon, Ukula, and Ukun, is a water god in Turkic mythology (especially Altay and Yakut). It protects the cleanliness of the water and fish. Before fishing, he is asked for permission and prayed that the fishing is auspicious. He resents those who pollute the water and dry the lakes, and punishes them. He does not welcome the burning of a fire on the icy part of the river in winter and holds a grudge against those who do so. The phrase "Küğöh Bolloh" (Yakut: Күөх боллох, "Sky Bulah") is sometimes used for him.

== Etymology ==
It derives from the root (Uk/Uğ). In Altaic languages, the verb Ukağah means to wash, while Uha means water in Buryat. Uğ/Uk means the origin, and water is also seen as the origin of everything.
