= Erkliğ Han =

Turkic and Altai deity

Erkliğ Han is the deity of space in Turkic and Altai mythology. He is responsible for stars, meteorites and celestial objects, and also associated with virility. Erkliğ means "strong".

In Tengrism, he is the lord of the planet Venus. According to the belief, Erkliğ Han is responsible for falling stars in the sky. These are called fiery arrows. He is also associated with the disappearing of stars during the rise of the sun by "killing" them.
