= Sazakan =

Turkish mythological creature

In Turkic mythology, a Sazakan is a dragon, hawk, falcon, or fiery dwarf who turns himself into a whirlwind and causes storms.

== Mythology ==
Sazakan is a spirit associated with bringing rain and hail. His influence on these precipitations can be positive, resulting with the amount of rain beneficial for agriculture, or negative, with a drought, downpours, or hail. Sazakans also have power over wind, which they use to intensify storms.

Sazakans live around hills, mountains, and high mounds; in the wilderness; and sometimes in the clouds. In Nogai folklore, Sazakans are described as being noisy spirits, and are the patron of the clouds.

== Sources ==
- Türk Mitoloji Sözlüğü, Pınar Karaca - "Sazakan"
