= Abzar iyesi =

Household spirit in Turkic mythology

In Turkic folklore, Abzar iyesi (Old Turkic: 𐰉𐰔𐰺:𐰃𐰘𐰾𐰃) is a household spirit. It is the protector spirit of courtyard. (The word "İye" means owner, master or possessor) Lives in the garden or courtyard of house.

== Features ==
Abzar iyesi is the Turkic spirit of the courtyard. It was associated with a farmstead's grounds, cattle shed, and stable. It is similar to the house spirit Ev iyesi, though it was less benevolent. Abzar iyesi was considered more dangerous than Ev iyesi as it could pose a threat to livestock, particularly animals with white fur. It can turn into ("shapeshifting") an animal form, especially a pet.

=== Abzar Ana ===
Abzar Ana is female form of Abzar iyesi. It has also been said that Abzar Ana can take on the appearance of cats or dogs. The actions performed by Abzar Ana vaguely resemble those of poltergeists and are not necessarily harmful.

=== Abzar Ata ===
Abzar Ata is male form of Abzar iyesi. Tatar folklore says that an Abzar iyesi could harass horses in the stable overnight, as well as steal the grain of a neighbour to feed his own horses.

== See also ==
- Dvorovoi
