= Azerbaijani folklore =

Folk tradition

Azerbaijani folklore (Azerbaijani: Azərbaycan folkloru) is the folk tradition of Azerbaijani people.

== Sources of Azerbaijani folklore ==
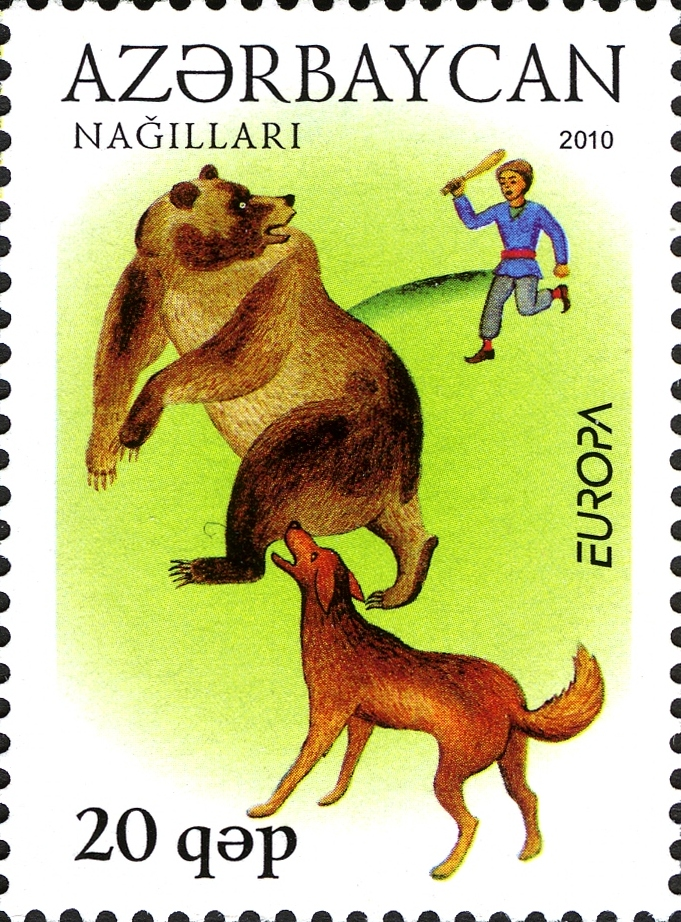
The tale of the lying shepherd.

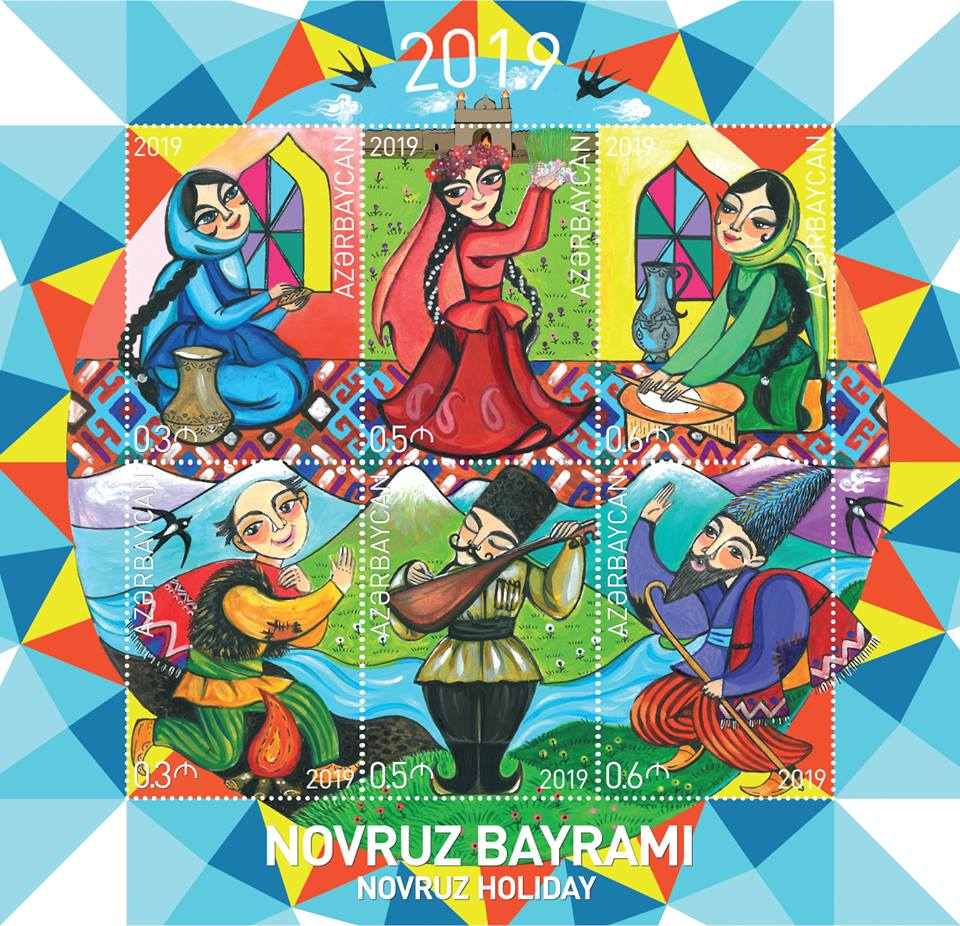
Stamps of Azerbaijan 2019.

Azerbaijani folklore is in many aspects, similar to that of other Turkic peoples. Eposes such as Kitabi-Dede Gorgud, Koroglu, Abbas and Gulgaz, Asli and Kerem, tales, holavars, lullabies, anecdotes, riddles, proverbs and aphorisms are widely spread. Turkic and thus many Azerbaijani myths are mainly based on the heroism and wisdom of a human being, which is demonstrated in epics such as Epic of Köroğlu, and Book of Dede Korkut.

=== Koroǧlu ===
The story of Koroǧlu (lit. 'son of the blind') begins with his father's loss of sight. The feudal lord Hasan Khan blinds his stable manager Ali Kişi for a trivial offense by plucking out his eyes. Koroghlu is a semi-mystical hero and bard among the Turkic people who is thought to have lived in 16th century. The name of "Koroghlu" means "the son of the blind", "the son of ember" or "the son of the clay" (the clay refers to death) in Turkic languages. His real name was Rövşən in Azerbaijani, Ruşen Ali in Turkish or Röwşen Aly in Turkmen, which was a loanword from Persian رُوشن Rowšan meaning light or bright.

=== Book of Dede Korkut ===
The character of Korkut is a white-bearded old man who is the narrative of the tale and guardian of the epic tradition. The book of Dede Korkut is known to the modern world from the two manuscripts belonging to the late 16th century.

=== Baba-I Amir ===
Baba-I Amir was a comic character in Azerbaijani folklore.

=== Bayati ===
“Bayati” is an Azeri poetic form characterised by four lines with seven syllables in each. These short poems depict the gamut of human feelings in a pithy manner. Several forms of this genre differ from one another according to their telling form and subject. For instance, bayati-baglama, bayati deyishme (competition in saying bayati), vesfi-hal (praising), petting, holavar (labor poems).

=== Ashik poetry ===
Ashik poetry is widespread among Turkic peoples, and other peoples like the Armenians, where they are called gusans. Poet-singers called ashiks narrate tales and legends with stringed instruments, like the saz. This way folk tales such as Köroǧlu and The Book of Dede Korkut preserved until today. The heroic dastan Koroglu is the most famous Turkic ashik epic. It is narrated by a third person, who is an ashik himself. Ashik stories can spread from their place of origin to many different regions, possibly changing their contents in each new region. In the Middle East ashiks regarded as a poet, singer, composer or musician. In Azerbaijani, the meaning of ashik is the lover of nature and life and accepted as a creator of national folk music and poetry.

=== Ceremonial songs and dances ===
Natural forces were the main subject for the national folklore samples in Azerbaijani folklore and people tried to express them by words or movements. The most popular ceremonial songs and dances were Kosa-Kosa, Godu-Godu, Novruz and Xidir Nabi which show dramatic genres of Azeri folklore.

== Supernatural beings ==
Almost all Azerbaijani supernatural beings are descended from Turkic mythology, or that of surrounding peoples believes.

- Meshe Adam (Azerbaijani: Meşə Adam), sometimes known as Ağac Kişi (literally 'tree man') is according to Azerbaijani and Karachay mythology a spirit, who lives in mountainous forests. It often represented in the form of hairy creatures of both sexes, being an ape with a human face and a sharp odor. It was believed that during their search for food, they go undercover to the gardens and orchards during the night while wearing discarded human clothes. According to some researchers, the Meshe Adam is a variant of the legend of the yeti. «Forest Man» is a common folklore figure for Caucasus region. In the article, “Forest Man” by W. Feuerstein close connection has been observed between the forest folk and the traditions of the sovereign of the game in the Caucasus. This connection displays itself beyond the boundaries of Caucasus like Scandinavian Skogsrå and a tricky Russian wood-sprite Leshy.
- Qulyabani (Azerbaijani: Qulyabani; borrowed from Persian: غول‌بیابانی Ghul-e Biābānī meaning 'the monster of the desert') is a giant with a long beard who is believed to eat people. He originates in Turkic mythology. In Turkish and therefore also Azerbaijani folklore, he is believed to have reversed feet and sleep in forests or graveyards during day and wake up during night. The cover of the first Ottoman Turkish edition of Gürpınar's novel portrays Gulyabani with a long white beard, a top hat and a walking stick which give an impression of old age. Moreover, while the rosary on his hand evokes religious connotations, his long nails, his haunting eyes and smile create a monstrous image. Essentially, he is an evil spirit, who lives in deserts and cemeteries.
- Tepegoz (Azerbaijani: Tepegöz) is a Turkic mythical creature similar to the cyclops Polyphemus. Tepegoz is a one-eyed monstrous figure in Turkic mythology, best known from the Book of Dede Korkut, a foundational epic of Oghuz Turkic culture in Azerbaijan and Anatolia. Described as a destructive being with impenetrable skin, Tepegoz terrorizes the Oghuz lands and cannot be harmed by conventional weapons. Many Oghuz warriors die attempting to defeat him. He is ultimately killed by Basat, his half-brother, who relies on intelligence rather than brute strength by striking Tepegoz’s single eye and beheading him with a magical sword. The Tepegoz episode reflects key themes of the Book of Dede Korkut, including heroism, the triumph of wisdom over physical power, and elements of ancient Turkic social life and warfare.

== Relations with other cultures ==
Azerbaijani folklore derives elements from Persian mythology & Turkic mythology.

== Developing activities ==
Regarding the UNESCO Convention of 20 October 2005, “On the Protection and Promotion of the Diversity of Cultural Expression” a number of activities have been carried out in the regions of Azerbaijan in order to promote the folklore, culture, and art of ethnic groups. Azerbaijan joined the convention in 2009. Azerbaijan Ministry of Culture and Tourism organizes a festival called “Azerbaijan, the native land” dedicated to the national minorities back in 2006. Within the framework of the festival, various ethnic minorities attend for presenting their folklore. Internationally broadcasting festival hosts approximately 500 participants from all ethnic regions of Azerbaijan. The festival is presented in English, too. There about 41 music and art schools for children in the regions where ethnic groups are populated. In those schools, folklore and ethnic culture are taught.

== Folklore institute ==
Azerbaijan folklore institute was established in 1994 on the basis of the Literature Institute named after Nizami Azerbaijan National Academy of Sciences (ANAS). Although it has started its activity as an independent structural unit of ANAS in 2003, in the early years of the establishment of Cultural Center it acted as a division of the center.

In 2012, the Department of Folklore and Ethnic Minorities, which is responsible for the collection of folklore samples, was launched in the Folklore Institute of Azerbaijan. The main goal of the department is to arrange the preservation and research of the assembled folklore samples.

== Publications and research ==
There are many books and articles in Persian such as, “Azerbayjan Folklorunden Numunahlar” by Hidayat Hasari and “Folklor Ganjinahsi, Oyunlar” by Zahareh Vafasi have been written about the Azerbaijani folklore, which cover various aspects of the country folklore. Samad Behrangi is a writer who was born in Tabriz in 1939 has written children's stories about Azerbaijani folklore. Yagub Khoshgabani and his wife collected and studied Azerbaijani folklore by travelling and taping folklore records in accordance with the statements of elders.

== See also ==
- Azerbaijani literature
- Azerbaijani fairy tales
- Azerbaijani mythology
- Turkic mythology
- Persian mythology
