= Yunak iyesi =

Yunak iyesi (Old Turkic: 𐰖𐰆𐰣𐰴:𐰃𐰘𐰾𐰃) is the bathhouse (or bathroom) spirit in Turkic mythology. Yunak means bathroom or bathhouse, and İye means something akin to owner or possessor.

In old Turkic culture, especially in rural areas, bathrooms were at a corner of the living room of the house. These were called Caghlyk. Every Caghlyk or Hammam had an İye (protector spirit), that called Caghlyk İyesi. If disturbed by an intruder while washing, Yunak İyesi might pour boiling water over them, or even strangle the passerby.

Yunak İyesi had the ability to predict the future. One consulted him by standing with one's back exposed in the half-open door of the bath. He would gently stroke one's back if all boded well; but if trouble lay ahead, he would strike with his claws.

== Hammam iyesi ==
Hammam iyesi was the name of bath spirit in the Turkic mythology. They were akin to the bathhouse spirit Yunak iyesi.
