= Korbolko =

In Turkic mythology, Korbolko is a bird made of fire. He is believed to have brought fire to the earth and taught people how to start a fire.

Korbolko is described as a large bird with majestic plumage that glows brightly emitting red and yellow light, like a bonfire that is just past the turbulent flame.

== Korbolko in tales ==
A typical role of the Korbolko in tales is as an object of a difficult quest. The quest is usually initiated by finding a lost tail feather, at which point the hero sets out to find and capture the live bird, sometimes of his own accord, but usually on the bidding of a father or Khagan (King). Korbolko is a marvel, highly coveted, but the hero, initially charmed by the wonder of the feather, eventually blames it for his troubles. Moreover, in the beginning of a fairy tale, the bird steals magical apples belonging to a king and is therefore pursued by the khagans servants in order to protect the precious apples.

The story of the Korbolko comes in many forms. Some folk tales say that it is a mystical bird that flies around a khans (kings) castle and at night swoops down and eats all the magical apples. Others say that this firebird is just a bird that flies around giving hope to those who need it. In a version of the tale, a Khan commands his three sons to capture Korbolko that keeps flying down from above and eating his apples. The magical apples are in the Khans orchard and give youth and strength to all who eat them. The sons end up barely missing the bird, but they catch one of his feathers that glows in the night. They take it to a dark room and it lights the room completely. The mystery of the feather has illuminated the hearts of men for many years.

== Etymology ==
Combined words, Kor (ember) and Bolko (bol-/bul-: to find), who gives the meaning of the fire-finder, or the term means prince of fire.

== See also ==
- Turul
- Oksoko
- Phoenix (mythology)
