= Yer iyesi =

Spirit or deity of earth or territory in Tengrism

Yer iyesi (Tatar: Җир Иясе or Cir İyäse, Chuvash: Ҫĕр Ийӗ, Sakha: Сир Иччи) is the spirit or deity of earth or territory in Tengrism. In Turkic languages Yer means land or earth. And İye is the familiar spirit of any natural asset. Yer iyesi protects the earth or any region. Also known as Toprak iyesi.

== Yer Ana ==
Yer Ana is the goddess of earth. Also referred to as goddess of fertility. She is the female form of Yer iyesi. She was said to have been there at the beginning of the world, when the earth and sky separated.

=== In other languages ===
- Tuvan: Чер Ава
- Uzbek: Yer Ona
- Tatar: Җир Әни or Җир Ана or Cir Ana
- Kazakh: Жер Ана
- Chuvash: Ҫĕр Анне or Ҫĕр Абай
- Bashkort: Ер Апай
- Sakha: Сир Ий̃э
- Turkmen: Ýer Ene or Ýer Eje
- Uyghur: يەر ئانا
- Ottoman: ير آنا
- Kyrgyz: Жер Эне
- Khakas: Чир Ине or Чир Иӌе
- Balkar: Джер Ана
- Gagauz: Yer Ana

== Yer Ata ==
Yer Ata is the god of earth or land. He is the male form of Yer iyesi.

=== In other languages ===
- Tuvan: Чер Ата
- Uzbek: Yer Ota
- Tatar: Җир Әти or Җир Ата or Cir Ata
- Kazakh: Жер Ата
- Chuvash: Ҫĕр Атте or Ҫĕр Ашшӗ
- Bashkort: Ер Атай
- Sakha: Сир Аҕа
- Turkmen: Ýer Ata
- Uyghur: يەر ئاتا
- Ottoman: ير آتا
- Kyrgyz: Жер Ата
- Khakas: Чир Аба or Чир Ада
- Balkar: Джер Ата
- Gagauz: Yer Ata

=== Yereh ===
Yereh (Chuvash: Йерех) is a female spirit in Turkic mythology, which recently came to be regarded as a "Turkic goddess" with a function of "hearth mother", protectoress of the home. It is akin of Yer iyesi. The word originates in the Pre-Christian Chuvash mythology but in the modern usage it has only one meaning. The confusion in the name's Etymology owes to the fact that a Turkic word Yer means land or earth, while the word Yerleşmek is a verb that means to locate. Early in the 20th century Yereh combined a prehistoric Scythian earth-goddess and Mother Earth. Today she is identified as a combination of the "hearth-mother" (associated with the guardianship of the nation itself) and the earth mother.

== Bibliography ==
- Hristiyanlaştırılan Türkler (Çuvaşlar), Durmuş Arık, Aziz Andaç Yayınevi
- Türk Mitolojisi Ansiklopedik Sözlük, Celal Beydili, Yurt Yayınevi
