= Solobung Yubin =

Solobung Yubin (in Mongolian), otherwise called (in language) Uhaa Solbon, is the "spirit of the evening and morning stars -- Venus (Solbon)." Or else, Solbon is Venus simply as "evening star". This name, defined as the "shepherd of heaven", is transcribed Ζὀλβων in Byzantine records. In Korean, it is variously written /čolbon/ (卒本) or /solbon/ (率本).

Uhaa Solbon is also "known by the name Uuden Tenger (tenger of the gate)". If this "gate" be equivalent to the "door" for which Viṣṇu is "door-keeper", then it may be pertinent that an incarnation of Vishnu "is related to the planet Venus".

== Bibliography ==
- Myths Connected With Mongol Religion, A Journey in Southern Siberia, by Jeremiah Curtin.
