= Orek =

Animated corpse in Turkic mythology

An Orek (Turkish: Örek, Azerbaijani: Örək, Tatar: Өрәк or Öräk, Bashkir: Өрәк) in Turkic folklore is an animated corpse brought back to life by magical means such as witchcraft.

The idea of Örek is present in some Turkic cultures. In some communities it is believed that a dead person can be turned into a Örek by a girl dressed in white. Öreks are undead creatures regularly encountered in folk narratives and legends. They are typically depicted as mindless, reanimated corpses with a hunger for human flesh.

Өрәк or Öräk means in Tatar and Bashkort 'soul' or 'ghost'.

== See also ==
- Өрәк (миф)
