= Hortdan =

Creature in Turkic mythology

In Turkic mythology, Hortdan (Turkish: Hortlak) is the troubled soul of the dead rising from the grave. Some Hortdan can be living people with certain magical properties. Some of the properties of the Hortdan include: the ability to transform into an animal, invisibility, and the propensity to drain the vitality of victims via blood loss. Hortdans are also known as immortal vampires.

== Origin ==
The Hortdans are creatures of Tatar folk mythology, as a representation of evil spirits, the spirits of the dead. As these stories were transmitted only by oral tradition, legend has lost its original substance, and Turkic people have transformed the Hortlak into bloodthirsty creatures. Originally, the Hortlak ghost is said to "appear" where the souls of murdered people have departed or where human blood has been shed. However, people most often encounter the ghost above the graves of the slain. It doesn't harm people; they only "see" it wandering or sitting there, mournfully making a sorrowful sound.

Hortdans are fictional undead creatures regularly encountered in horror and fantasy themed narratives. They are typically depicted as mindless, reanimated corpses with a hunger for human flesh.

== Etymology ==
The name Hortdan (or Hortlak) is related to the Turkic verb hortlamak, which in Turkish means get out and especially get out of the grave.

== Different types of Hortdan ==
- Hortlak is the name of this creature in Turkish culture. And refers to a Zombie-like entity.
- Xortdan is the Azerbaijani etymology of the vampire.
- Hortan (sometimes Аза-Хортан "Aza-Hortan") is a poltergeist like an evil spirit in Tuva tradition.
