= Tamag =

Name of hell in Tengrism

Tam (also tam, tamuk, tam or tamu) is the name of hell in Tengrism and Turkic mythology. It is the place where criminals go to be punished after they die. There are several depictions of Tamag, but the common point in almost all views is about the fire. Erlik Khan is the deity ruling hell and punishes the all people. Further, there is another entity named Tami Han who is governing Tam in Khakasian lore. Ancient Turks believed that Tam is underground. It was believed that the people in Tam would be brought to the third floor of the sky after they had served their imprisonment in Tam. Tamag is the opposite of Uçmag (heaven).

According to the beliefs of the Tuvans, the earth has three lowers, and beneath them are 18 layers of hell-fires (Tamas).

== See also ==
- Erlik
- Kṣitigarbha
- King Yama
- Yamāntaka
- Yanluo Wang
- Youdu
