= Mhachkay =

Mhachkay ("Turkish: Meçkey", "Tatar Language: Мәцкәй (Мәчкәй) and Mäçkäy or Мәчекәй sometimes Мәсек", "Azerbaijani Language: Məçkəy'', "Russian: Mасек'') is a creature in Turkic (especially Tatar) mythology which is somewhat similar to a vampire.

== Description ==
A person born with two hearts and two souls was believed to be a Mhachkay. When one was recognized it was chased away from human habitations. Mhachkays were usually people who died at a young age, but only one soul passed on, and the other soul caused the deceased Mhachkay to come alive and prey upon other living beings. These undead creatures fly at night in the form of an owl and attack night-time travelers and people who wander off into the woods, sucking out their blood and eating out their insides. A Mhachkay could also be satisfied with animal blood, for a short period of time. When a person recognized as a Mhachkay dies, decapitating the corpse and burying the head separate from the rest of the body is said to prevent a Mhachkay from rising back from the dead; burying the body face down with a sickle around its head is said to work as well. Anyone found wandering the forests with fresh soil and blood covering their hands, and possibly torn fingernails were believed to be a Mhachkay as well.

== A Mhachkay event in the Ottoman Empire ==
Ahmed Şükrü Efendi, kadı (judge) of Veliko Tarnovo, reported an event to the capital city. With a letter he published the happenings in the journal Takvim-i Vakayi (date: 19 Rebiulahir 1249 /1833):

“There have been manifestations of vampires in Tirnovo. (...) A huge crowd went to the graveyard. As he turned the painted piece of wood on his finger, the painting stood in front of the graves of two brigands, Tetikoğlu Ali and Apti Alemdar, formerly members of the Janissary corps, and bloody tyrants. The graves were dug up. The cadavers were found to have grown by a half, their hair and nails had grown longer by three or four inches. Their eyes were inundated by blood, and looked terrifying. All of the crowd assembled at the graveyard saw it. When alive, these men had committed all kinds of mischief, including rape, theft and murder; when their corps was abolished, they had not been delivered to the executioner, interestingly, as evidenced by their age they had died a natural death. Unsatisfied by their mischievous life, they now harassed people as evil spirits. According to the description of Nikola the exorcist, in order to expel such evil spirits, one has to drive a wooden stake into the belly of their cadavers and pour boiling water onto their hearts. Ali Alemdar’s and Apti Alemdar’s corpses were removed from their graves. Wooden stakes were driven into their bellies and their hearts were boiled with a cauldron of water, but with no result. The exorcist said: we must burn these corpses.”
