= Od iyesi =

Turkic and Mongolian spirit or deity of fire

Od iyesi (Tatar: Ут Иясе or Ut İyäse; Chuvash: Вут Ийӗ; Sakha: Уот Иччи) is the Turkic and Mongolic spirit or deity of fire. In Turkic languages, Od (or Ot) means fire, and iye is the familiar spirit of any natural asset, literally meaning "master" or "possessor." Od iyesi protects the fire.

== Od Ana ==
Od Ana is the Turkic and Mongolian goddess of fire. She is also referred to as goddess of marriage. She is the female form of Od iyesi. The name Ot Ene means "fire mother" in the Altay language (od "fire"; ene "mother"). In Mongolian folklore, she is referred to as the "queen of fire." She was said to have been born at the beginning of the world, when the earth and sky separated and daughter of Yer Tanrı.

Some equate her to Umai, the mother goddess of the Turkic Siberians, who is depicted as having sixty golden tresses that look like the rays of the sun. Umai is thought to have once been identical with Ot of the Mongols.

Tengri, the chief god, orders three fires to be burnt in the human soul, and Od Ana buries and puts out the three fires on Earth. Today, Turkish people call this "cemre," the fire that falls to Air, Earth and Water every year.

=== In Turkic languages ===
- Tuvan: От Ава
- Uzbek: O't Ona or Otash Ona
- Tatar: Ут Әни or Ут Ана or Ut Ana
- Azerbaijani: Od Ana
- Kazakh: От Ана
- Chuvash: Вут Анне or Вут Абай
- Bashkir: Ут Апай
- Yakut: Уот Ий̃э
- Turkmen: Ot Ene or Ot Eje
- Uyghur: ئوت ئانا
- Turkish: Od Ana
- Ottoman Turkish: اود آنا
- Kyrgyz: От Эне
- Altai: От Эне
- Khakas: От Ине or От Иӌе
- Karachay-Balkar: От Ана
- Gagauz: Od Ana

Its name in Hungarian culture is Tűz Anya and in Mongolian belief is Гал Ээж (Buryat: Гал Эхэ; Oirat: Һал Эк). These entities have many similarities, and each has the same meaning, "fire mother."

== Od Ata ==
Od Ata is the Mongolian and Turkic / Altai god of fire. He is the male form of Od iyesi. Od Ede means 'Fire Father' in the Altay language (od "fire"; ede "father"). In Mongolian folklore he is referred to as the Od Khan "king of fire". Od Khan (or Odqan) is a fire spirit in the shamanistic traditions of Mongolia. He is usually described as a red coloured humanoid, riding a brown goat. His female counterpart is Yalun Eke (Yalın Eke), the 'fire mother' and son of Kayra.

=== In Turkic languages ===
- Tuvan: От Ата
- Uzbek: O't Ota or Otash Ota
- Tatar: Ут Әти or Ут Ата or Ut Ata
- Azerbaijani: Od Ata
- Kazakh: От Ата
- Chuvash: Вут Атте or Вут Ашшӗ
- Bashkir: Ут Атай
- Yakut: Уот Аҕа
- Turkmen: Ot Ata
- Uyghur: ئوت ئاتا
- Turkish: Od Ata
- Kyrgyz: От Ата
- Altai: От Ада
- Khakas: От Аба or От Ада
- Karachay-Balkar: От Ата
- Gagauz: Od Ana

Its name in Hungarian culture is Tűz Atya or Tűz Apa and in Mongolian belief is Гал Эцэг (Buryat: Гал Эсэгэ; Oirat: Һал эцк). These entities have many similarities, and each has the same meaning, "fire father."

== Similar creatures ==
1. Ocak iyesi ("hearth spirit") is spirit of hearths. It is one kind of Od iyesi.
2. Soba iyesi ("stove spirit") is a fire spirit as well.
