= Erlik =

God of the underworld in Turkic and Mongolic mythology

Erlik, Erlik Khan
- Death and Underworld
- Abode: Tamag
- Symbol: Monster
- Ethnic group: Turkic peoples Mongolic peoples

Genealogy
- Parents: Kayra and Yer Tanrı
- Siblings: Umay; Ülgen; Koyash; Ay Ata

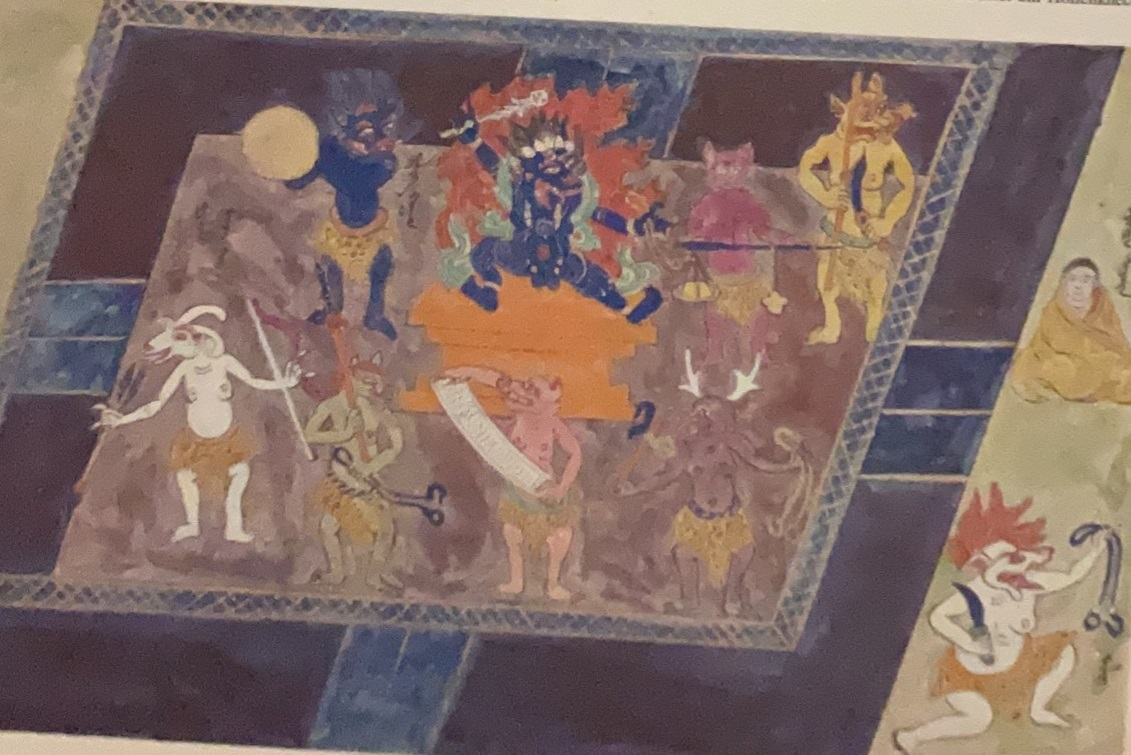
The city of the infernal king Erlik-Khan, surrounded by iron walls, precedes court over the souls of the dead. In front of him, a hell-being is reading the scrolls of sins and virtues.

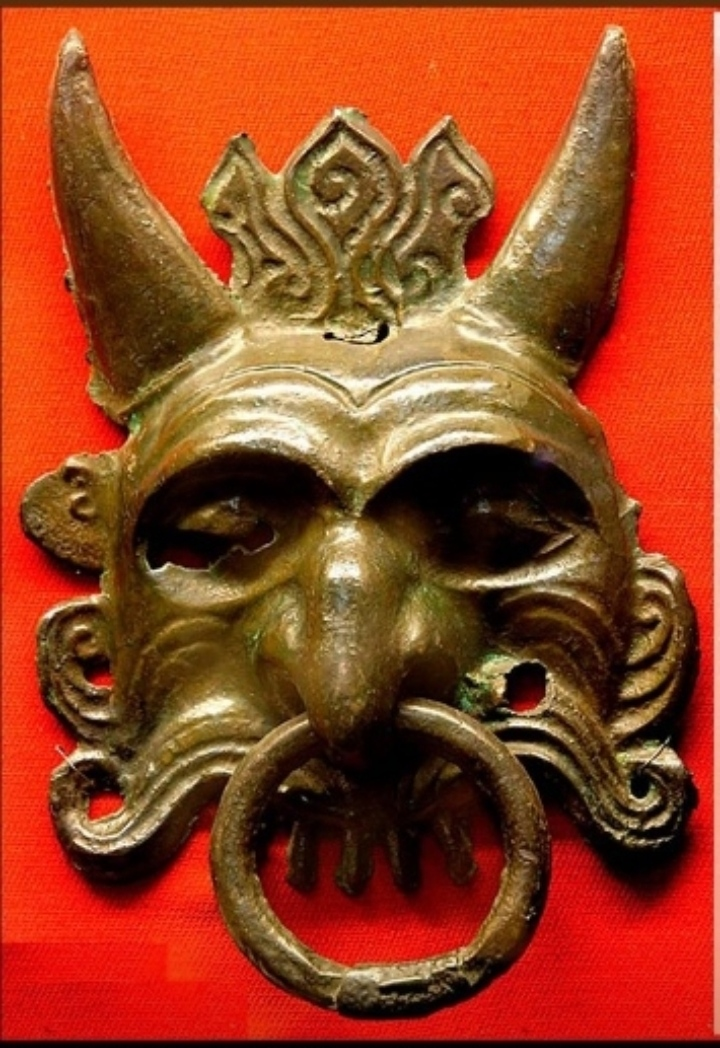
Door knocker in the form of Erlik

In Turkic mythology Erlik, Erlig, Erlik Khan (Old Turkic: 𐰀𐰼𐰠𐰃𐰚; Turkish: Erlik Han) is the god of death and the underworld, sometimes referred to as Tamag (hell). Er (or yer) means Earth, in the depths of which Erlik lives.

From the underworld, Erlik brings forth death, plague and evil spirits to torment humans and to take their souls into his realm. Since Tengrism is not based on a written corpus but encompasses the experienced spiritual life of Turkic people, there are no unanimous beliefs among all Turkic people. Erlik was already mentioned in the Orkhon writings and shows a consistent pattern as the lord of the underworld among Turkic belief-systems. In Mongolian, Erlik is referred to as Erleg or Yerleg, and in Hungarian mythology he is equivalent to Ördög.

== Legends ==
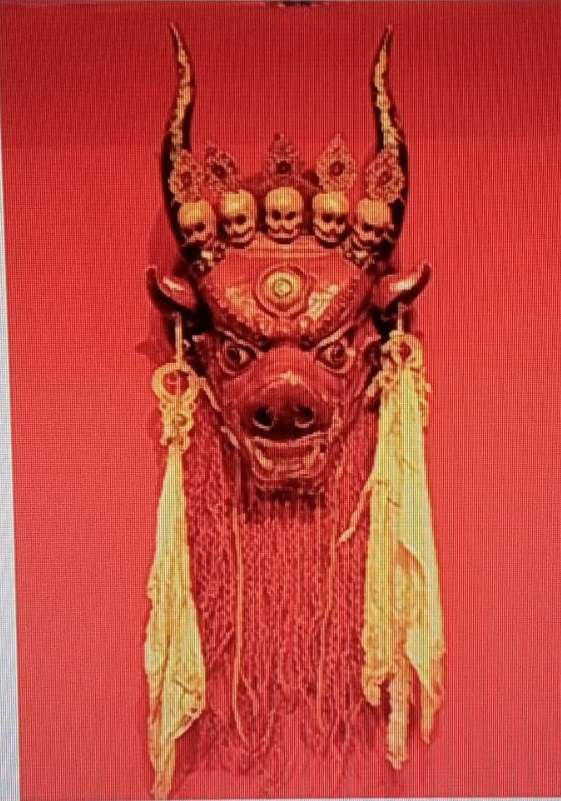
Mask representing Erlik Han

In Turkic mythology, Erlik was involved in the creation of humanity. He slew the messenger-god, Maidere/Maydere, and is a teacher of sin. He is sometimes represented by a totemic bear.

In Turkic mythology, Erlik was the deity of evil, darkness, lord of the lower world and judge of the dead. Erlik is a brother of Ülgen, they both have been created from Kayra (Tengere Kayra Khan) the god of it. He wants to be equal to Ulgen, he makes his own land and was sent to the prison at the 9th layer of the earth and became opposed to the upper world, the realm of light. According to the Khakas, Erlik resides in the deepest underworld in a palace of copper with furniture made of gold.

According to an Altai legend, Erlik created the spirits (İye) while he was still in heaven. Erlik and his spirits were cast out and fell to earth together when he claimed divinity for himself. Another legend of the Altai people recorded states, God (Tengri) endowed Erlik with a hammer and an anvil, but took his power away when Erlik was creating evil with it.

According to another legend, recorded by Vasily Radlov, God ordered the first human to dive into the primordial water and remove a handful of soil from the bottom of the sea. The first human, however, desired to hide some soil in order to create his own world later. But the soil in his mouth grew and he spit it out. Kayra, who designs the world in this legend, cast the first human away from the heavenly realm as means of punishment and thus named him Erlik.

In yet another narrative, people have been immortal before the advent of Erlik. People and animals overpopulated the world, until a crow suggested to summon Death into the world. So people summoned Erlik, whereupon death enters. First, all people knew when they would die, and so they lived in fear, until Tengri hid their date of death.

The evil spirits created by Erlik cause misfortune, sickness and death to mankind. These spirits are imagined as Erlik's assistants. Besides these, his nine sons and daughters help their father in the way of evil. Erlik's daughters especially try to change a shaman's mind while he is attempting to reach Ulgen with their beauties. Erlik gives all kinds of sickness and wants sacrifices from the people. If they do not sacrifice to him, he catches the dead bodies of the people that he killed and takes them away to this lower world and then makes them his slaves. So, especially in the Altays, when sickness appears, people become scared of Erlik and make many animal sacrifices to him.

In the prayers of shamans, Erlik is described as a monster, having the face and teeth of a pig combined with a human body. Besides his face, he is an old man with a well-built body, black eyes, eyebrows and mustache.

According to the Dolgans, Erlik took mammoths down to the underworld. Whenever they try to get back to the surface, they freeze to death as punishment.

The dinosaur Erlikosaurus is named after him.

== Children of Erlik ==
Erlik has nine sons, named Karaoğlanlar ("dark boys"). They are Karash Khan, Matır Khan, Shingay Khan, Komur Khan, Badish Khan, Yabash Khan, Temir Khan, Uchar Khan, and Kerey Khan. He also has nine daughters, named Karakızlar ("dark girls"), their names being unknown.

=== Karaoghlanlar ===
They are the sons of Erlik.

1. Karash Han: The god of darkness.
2. Matyr Han: The god of courage and bravery.
3. Shyngay Han: The god of chaos.
4. Komur Han: The god of evil.
5. Badysh Han: The god of disaster.
6. Yabash Han: The god of defeat.
7. Temir Han: The god of iron and mining.
8. Uchar Han: The god of informants.
9. Kerey Han: The god of discord.

== In religious practices ==
Erlik was worshiped in some traditional religions in Siberia and Central Asia, such as by Buryats. As Erlik is seen as the ruler of demons and the underworld, sacrifices are made for him to get rid of diseases or for the sake of people, who will enter the underworld after death. Alternatively people sacrifice to Erlik in order to get a higher rank in his underworld. Shamans who venerate Erlik are called Black Shamans (kara kam). Their practice is usually frowned upon, since they negotiate with demonic spirits. Erlik cannot claim every soul but only the evil ones. When a person dies, Erlik sends a kormos (some sort of ghost) in order to take the soul, simultaneously, heaven sends a spirit to carry the soul to heaven. The alignment of the soul determines the outcome of the struggle of these two spirits. According to Verbitski, Turkic sources report that God once said to Erlik:

Now, you have been a sinful. You thought evil against me. Even the people who believe you will think badness. The people who obey me will be clean and pure. They will see the sun. Hereafter, your name will be Erlik, the people who hide their sins from me will be your public; the people who hide their sins from you will be my public.

— Verbitski 1903: 102–103; İnan 1972: 19–21)

While some scholars believe that Erlik points to some sort of dualism between the divine heaven and the lower earth within Tengrist cosmology, others argue that Ülgan and Erlik are two rulers alongside Tengri, representing good and evil respectively.

== See also ==
- Angra Mainyu
- Azazil
- Erlking
- Erlikosaurus
- Hades
- King Yama
- Lucifer
- Ördög
- Set
- Veles
- Yama
- Yamāntaka
- Yanluo Wang

== General and cited references ==
- "Упоминание божества Эрлика в древнетюркской рунической надписи Алтын-Кёль (Runic Inscriptions from Khakassia)" (in Russian). Archived from the original on 2009-04-03.
