= Azerbaijani mythology =

Aspect of Azerbaijani culture

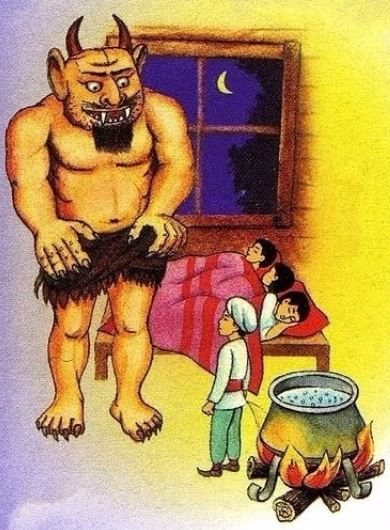
Mythological giant Div on the poststamp of Azerbaijan

Azerbaijani mythology (Azerbaijani: Azərbaycan mifologiyası) are mythological representations of the Azerbaijani people.

Azerbaijani myths and legends were created on the basis of the people's faith in mythical and semi-mythical beings - carriers of good and evil. Mythical unities such as Earth - Sky, Sea - Mountain, Water - Fire, Man - Beast, Tree - Flower, Wind - Mudflow, dominate the mythological system. Stories related to these unities were created as society developed. These stories characterize the early development of the people. These stories were transmitted orally over many centuries. Another group of mythical unities as separate stories became part of various Azerbaijani folklore genres.

Although the mythology of the Azerbaijani people was influenced by outside forces, it retained local colour. The mythology of Kumyk people is also interconnected.

The origins of some Azerbaijani myths lie in the monumental epic Oguz-Name, as well as in the stories of the Oghuz heroic epic Kitab Dede Korkud, which includes early Turkic representations and archaic views formed in the Caucasus.

== Literature ==
- Каракашлы, К. Т. (1964). "Материальная культура азербайджанцев Северо-восточной и Центральной зон Малого Кавказа: историко-этнографическое исследование". Каракашлы. Б.: Издательство Академии наук Азербайджанской ССР: 282.
- Сејидов, М. (1983). Азәрбајҹан мифик тәфәккүрүнүн гајнаглары. Б.: Јазычы.
- Набиев, А. (1986). Взаимосвязи азербайджанского и узбекского фольклора. Б.: Язычы – via Научный редактор доктор филологических наук А. Дж. Гаджиев.
- Азербайджанские сказки, мифы, легенды. Б.: Азербайджанское государственное издательство. 1988 – via Составитель, автор предисловия А. Набиев. Редактор Т. Рашевская.
- Азәрбајҹан мифоложи мәтнләри. Б.: Элм. 1988 – via Составитель, автор предисловия и комментариев Ариф Аджалов.
- Сеһрли сүнбүлләр (Азәрбајҹан мифләри). Б.: Ҝәнҹлик. 1990 – via составитель А. Набиев.
- Әфәндијев, П. (1992). Азәрбајҹан шифаһи халг әдәбијјаты. Б.: Маариф – via Научный редактор А. Набиев.
- Пашаев, В. П. (2009). "О некоторых древнетюркских мотивах в азербайджанских вышивках" (Истоки и эволюция художественной культуры тюркских народов ed.). Заман: 391.
- Ramazan, Qafarlı (2010). Azərbaycan-türk mifologiyası. Б.: ADPU-nun nəşri – via Редактор С. Рзасой.
- Qafarlı, Ramazan (2010), AZƏRBAYCAN TÜRKLƏRİNİN MİFOLOGİYASI, ADPU
