= Mergen =

Turkic deity

Mergen (Old Turkic: 𐰢𐰼𐰏𐰤) is a Turkic deity of abundance and wisdom. Mergen is often depicted with a bow and arrow in one hand. Other important symbols include a white horse and the color white. He is associated with profundity and depicted as a strong and powerful bull. Mergen is the son of Kayra and the brother of Ulgan, and lives on the seventh floor of sky. He was portrayed as a young man with a helmet and a bow riding on a white horse. Mergen symbolizes intelligence and thought.

== Etymology ==
The word Mergen means archer or bowman in Turkic languages. In the Bashkir language the word märgän (мәргән) means marksman or sniper, while in Khalkha the cognate Mergen (мэргэн) means wise or genius.

== See also ==
- Zasa Mergen Baatar

== Bibliography ==
- Sarangerel (Julie Ann Stewart) : Chosen by the Spirits : Following Your Shamanic Calling. Destiny Books, Rochester (VT), 2001.
