= Kayra =

Creator god in Turkic mythology

- God of creation

Genealogy
- Parents: Tengri
- Children: Erlik; Ülgen; Kyzaghan; Mergen; Yer Tanrı; Umay

Kayra or Kaira (Old Turkic: 𐰴𐰖𐰺𐰀) is the creator god in Turkic mythology. They are the god who planted the tree of life called Ulukayın. Kayra is described as both father and mother, and resides in the 17th layer of heaven.

Kayra is the supreme god of the pantheon and the child of the sky deity named Tengri. Kayra is occasionally identified with Kara Han (the black king or ruler of the land – Kara may mean land, earth, black or in a sense strong, powerful), a child of Tengri, who left their father's home in heaven and went to live in the underworld.

== Etymology ==
The name of this deity is found in several forms, as is that of their opponent. "Kayra-Khan" which may be translated as "merciful king", while the form "Kara Han" signifies "black king". Furthermore, the Turkish word kara can mean both black and land, with the result that Kara Han can mean not only 'Black (Dark) Ruler' but also 'Ruler of the Land'.

== God of creation ==
In the Altai myth of creation, Tengri (God) Kayra Han is neither male nor female nor even human in form, but a pure-white goose that flies constantly over an endless expanse of water (time), the benign creator of all that is, including the other, lesser gods.

Among the Altai people a dualistic division is most clear (Ulgen vs. Erlik), and the highest god is Tengre Kaira Khan, who is a good power. Before the goddess Ak Ana appears to urge Kara Han to create, it becomes anxious, and its creation occurs in a context of loneliness, turmoil and fear: The water becomes turbulent, but Kara Han reassures itself that it "need not fear" (the implication of such self-reassurance being that it is indeed afraid).

Kara Han is a supreme being in the universe it created, the ruler of the three realms of air, water, and land. They are seated on the seventeenth level of the universe, from which it directs the fate of its creation. Kara Han has three sons: Ulgan, Mergen, and Kyzaghan. After creating the universe Kara Han planted the nine-boughed tree of life, from the branches of which came the ancestors of humans – the nine races (nine clans) emerged from the tree.

A Tuvinian / Soyoth legend, goes as follows:

The giant turtle which supported the earth moved, which caused the cosmic ocean to begin flooding the earth. An old man who had guessed something like this would happen, had built a raft. He boarded it with his family, and they were saved from the flooding. When the flood waters receded, the raft was left on a high wooded mountain, where, it is said, it remains today. After the flood Kaira Khan created everything around the world. Among other things, they taught people how to make arak (anise drink).

== See also ==
- Bai-Ulgan
- Turul

== Bibliography ==
- Türk Mitolojisi, Murat Uraz, OCLC 245853289
- Türk Mitolojisi Ansiklopedik Sözlük, Celal Beydili, Yurt Yayınevi (Page-305, Kayrakan)
