= Yer Tanrı =

Turkic goddess

Yer Tanrı is an Earth deity in Turkish and Altaic folk belief and mythology, also called Yertengri or Certenger. Sometimes it represents evil and human and sensual formations. It remains in the background next to the Gök Tengri. It is not very much depicted in human form. However, it is often perceived as a feminine being. The Earth or World is expressed as “Yertinç / Yerdinç”.

A white chicken is sacrificed to Tengri. Sometimes fish, sheep or oxen are sacrificed. Especially his head is buried in the ground. In some tales, weak and frail children are buried by their parents, these children grow stronger there and emerge as valiant three days later.

Infertile women pray to Mother Earth under a blessed tree. In the fairy tales, Mother Earth breastfeeds the heroes from her right breast and two from her left breast once, and the valiant gains incredible strength.

In the Yakut heroic epics, the valiant people who will be invincible in the future are frail and weak in childhood. Even their parents do not want to accept them. However, after digging and burying these children in the ground, these children, who are strengthened by being fed by the Earth God (Yer Tanrı), turn into incredibly strong and handsome legendary heroes. This is the meaning of shaking crazy people into wells even today in some regions of Anatolia.

It is said that there are no pictures showing the earth deity. However, sometimes they describe her as a white-haired woman living in the trunk of a large beech tree. The branches of this tree reach up to the sky, which is owned by the spirit that sends people the most beautiful horses as gifts.

== Yereh Khan ==
Yereh Khan - is the family god in Turkish and Altaic mythology. The earth is an entity connected with the concept of God. Protects family and home. The word has the same root as the verb to settle. Yeröh means wish in Mongolian. It lives in baskets made of tree bark at home and placed behind doors. These baskets made for him are also called Yereh. These baskets, which have been preserved for seven generations, are called Yereh Türkelli. When young girls become brides, they take their baskets (that is, their guardian spirits) with them, and the origin of the concept of dowry is probably based on this practice. He is prayed for the healing of skin diseases. The word has the same root as the verb to settle. Yeröh means wish in Mongolian.
