= Ülgen =

Turkic creator-deity

- Planets, Stars, and Shamans
- Abode: Sky
- Symbol: Pleiades
- Ethnic group: Turkic peoples

Genealogy
- Parents: Kayra
- Siblings: Umay; Erlik; Koyash; Ay Tanrı
- Children: Karshtyt Khagan; Bura Khagan; Burcha Khagan; Yashyl Khagan; Karakush Khagan; Kanym Khagan; Bakhty Khagan

Bai-Ülgen or Ülgen (Old Turkic: 𐰈𐰞𐰏𐰅𐰣; Cyrillic: Үлгэн) is a Turkic creator-deity, usually distinct from Tengri but sometimes identified with him in the same manner as Helios and Apollo. His name is from Old Turkic bay, "rich", and ülgen, "magnificent". Ülgen is believed to be without either beginning or end.

== Features ==
In Tengrism, the Ulukayın, regarded as a cosmic axis between earth and sky, was regarded as sacred to him, as was the horse (horse-sacrifice was a part of his worship). Ülgen symbolizes goodness, welfare, abundance, plentiness of food, water, etc. Furthermore, he created earth, heaven and all living beings. In addition, he controls the atmospheric events and movements of stars. He creates land for people to live on, the heads of both humans and animals and the rainbow. He was regarded as the patron god of shamans and the source of their knowledge.

It is believed that Ülgen has been created from Kayra (Tengere Kayra Khan). He is the highest deity after Tengri in the pantheon. Often, Ülgen is compared with Tengri and at times they are thought to be on par, or even the same. In some sayings, the name/function of Ülgen may be (partially) interchangeable with that of Tengri.

Ülgen is described as the enemy of Erlik who is the god of evil and darkness. Ülgen assumes the protectorship of humankind against him.

Bai-Ülgen lives on the sixteenth floor of the sky above the stars, sun and moon in a golden house. Mere humans may never reach him, only shamans and kams who possess astral powers can. Animals are used for sacrifice in worship of him, especially horses. Once in every third, sixth, ninth, or twelfth year, a shaman may sacrifice a white horse as the first step of reaching Ülgen. Then he must ride its soul, penetrate through all the layers of heaven until he reaches Ülgen. Firstly, the kam (shaman) meets Yayık who is the servant of Ülgen. This entity informs the kam whether or not the offering has been accepted. If the sacrificial rite has been successful, the shaman is able to learn from the omniscient Ülgen of impending dangers, such as bad harvests.

== Children of Ülgen ==
Ülgen has seven sons, the Ak oğlanlar (White Boys) or Kıyatlar:

Ak oğlanlar – Kıyatlar the seven sons of Ülgen
	Khagan name	Han name	Role
1	Karshyt Khagan	Karşıt Han	The god of purity.
2	Bura Khagan	Pura Han	The god of horses.
3	Burcha Khagan	Burça Han	The god of prosperity.
4	Yashyl Khagan	Yaşıl Han	The god of nature.
5	Karakush Khagan	Karakuş Han	The god of birds.
6	Kanym Khagan	Er Kanım	The god of confidence.
7	Bakhty Khagan	Baktı Han	The god of blessing

Ülgen also has nine daughters, called Akkızlar or Kıyanlar, but no one knows their names. His daughters are source of inspiration for shamans.

== Bibliography ==
- Çoban, Ramazan Volkan. Türk Mitolojisinde İyilik Tanrısı Ülgen'in İnanıştaki Yeri, Tasviri ve Kökeni (Turkish)
- Anokhin, "Materials on Shamanism of Altai", Museum of Anthropology and Ethnography at the Russian Academy of Sciences, Leningrad 1924
- Tokarev, "Religion in the history of the world", Moscow 1986
