= Ece =

Ece (IPA: [ˈedʒe]) is a feminine given name of Turkish origin. In Turkish, it means queen. Notable people with the name include:

== Given name ==
- Ece Ayan (born 1998), Swedish artistic gymnast
- Ece Ayhan (1931–2002), Turkish poet
- Ece Çeşmioğlu (born 1990), Turkish actress
- Ece Dizdar (born 1981), Turkish actress
- Ece Asude Ediz (born 2002), Turkish boxer
- Ece Ege (born 1963), Turkish fashion designer
- Ece Erken (born 1978), Turkish actress
- Ece Haraç (born 2002), Turkish table tennis player
- Ece Hocaoğlu (born 1994), Turkish volleyball player
- Ece İrtem (1991–2026), Turkish actress
- Ece Şahiner (born 2000), Turkish hockey player
- Ece Seçkin (born 1991), Turkish singer
- Ece Soydam (born 1971), Turkish documentary filmmaker
- Ece Sükan (born 1977), Turkish actress, stylist, creative director, and fashion editor
- Ece Tekmen (born 2002), Turkeish women's footballer
- Ece Temelkuran (born 1973), Turkish journalist
- Ece Türkoğlu (born 1999), Turkish football player
- Ece Üner (born 1981), Turkish TV presenter and news anchor
- Ece Uslu (born 1974), Turkish actress
- Ece Vahapoğlu (born 1978), Turkish author, television host, and journalist
- Ece Yaprak, American engineering academic
- Ece Yaşar (born 1990), Turkish karateka
- Ece Yağmur Yavuz (born 2004), Turkish artistic gymnast
- Ece Yüksel (born 1997), Turkish actress
- İnci Ece Öztürk (born 1997), Turkish bocce

== Surname ==
- Arzu Ece (born 1963), Turkish singer
- Eda Ece (born 1990), Turkish actress
- Keriman Halis Ece (1913–2012), Turkish pianist, fashion model and Miss Turkey 1932
- Meral Hussein-Ece, Baroness Hussein-Ece (born 1953), British Liberal Democrat member of the House of Lords

== See also ==
- Ecem
- Umay, also known as Ece, the Turkic earth goddess
