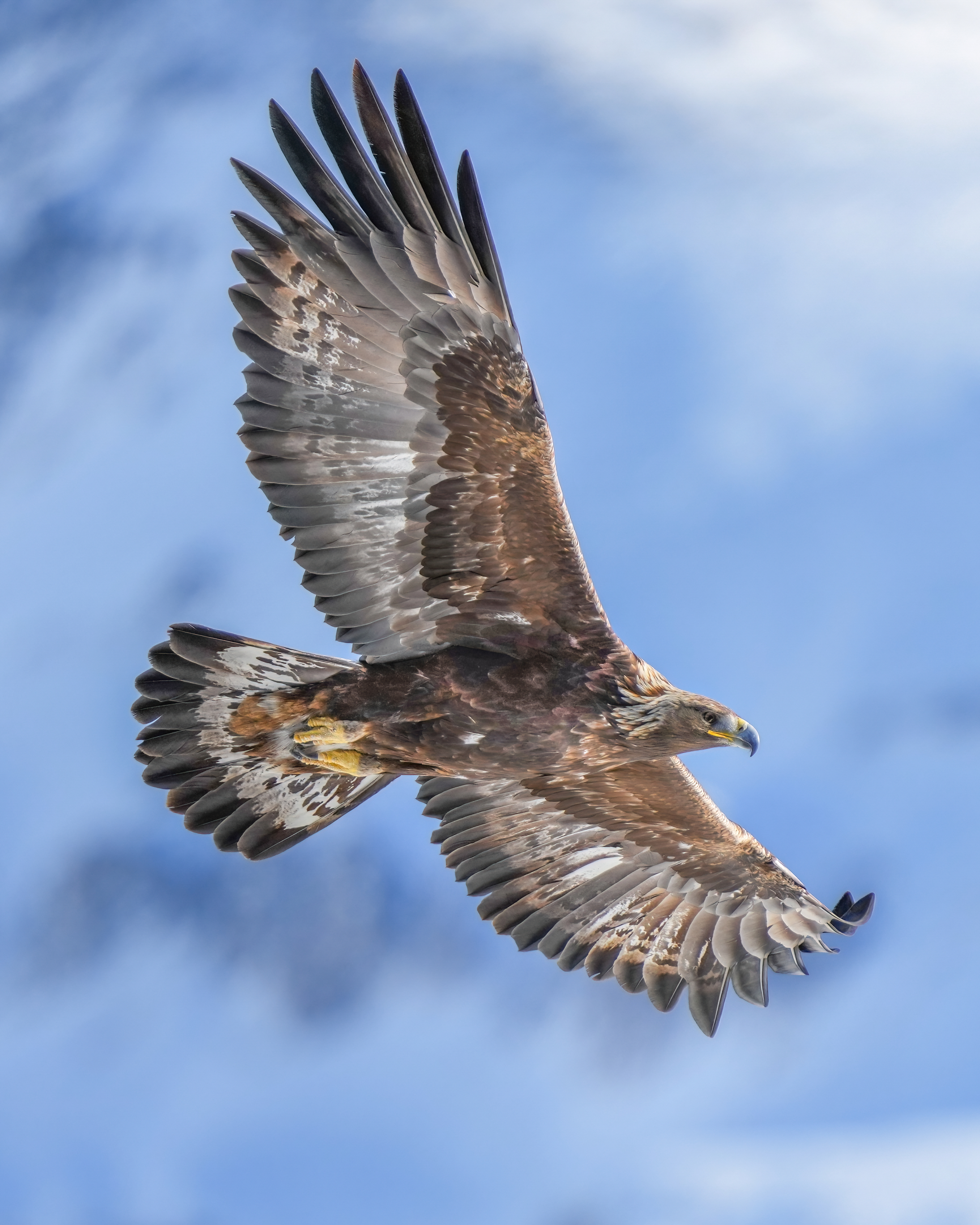
- Wild golden eagle in flight at Pfyn-Finges, Switzerland

Conservation status
- Least Concern (IUCN 3.1)
- CITES Appendix II

Scientific classification
- Kingdom: Animalia
- Phylum: Chordata
- Class: Aves
- Order: Accipitriformes
- Family: Accipitridae
- Genus: Aquila
- Species: A. chrysaetos

Binomial name
- Aquila chrysaetos (Linnaeus, 1758)

Subspecies
- 6, see text
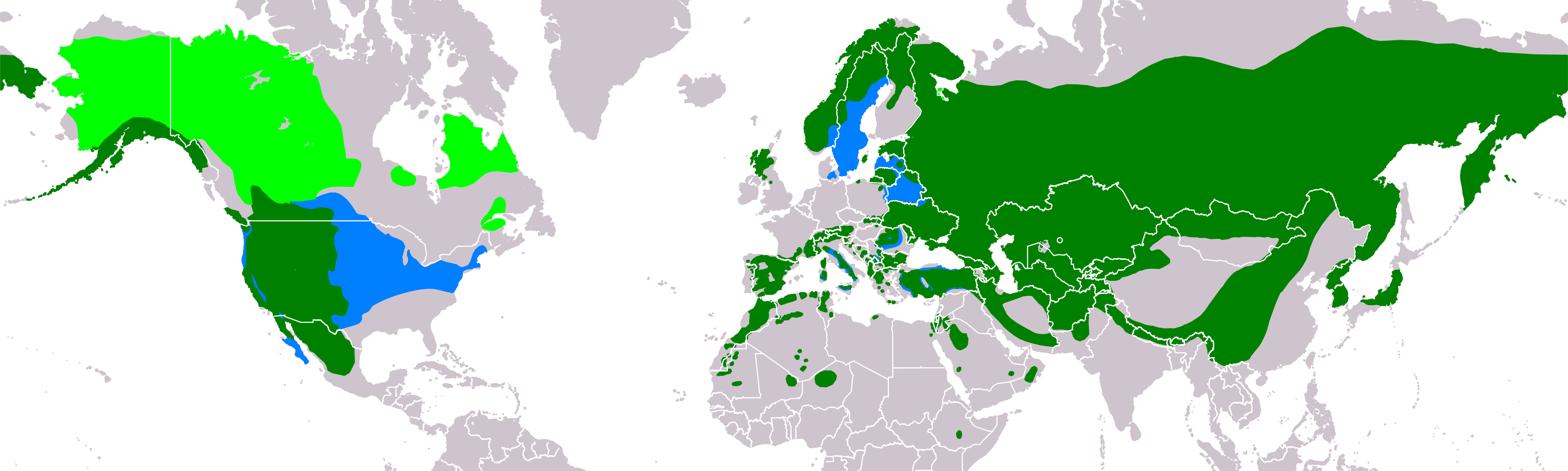
- Range of A. chrysaetos Nesting, present in summer Nesting, present all year Non-nesting

Synonyms
- Falco chrysaëtos Linnaeus, 1758; Falco fulvus Linnaeus, 1758

Audio
- Call of a golden eagle in Scotland

= Golden eagle =

Golden eagle Temporal range: Pliocene–recent

Species of eagle

The golden eagle (Aquila chrysaetos) is a bird of prey living in the Northern Hemisphere. It is the most widely distributed species of eagle. Like all eagles, it belongs to the family Accipitridae. They are one of the best-known birds of prey in the Northern Hemisphere. These birds are dark brown, with lighter golden-brown plumage on their napes. Immature eagles of this species typically have white on the tail and often have white markings on the wings. Golden eagles use their agility and speed combined with powerful feet and large, sharp talons to hunt a variety of prey, mainly hares, rabbits, marmots, and other ground squirrels.

Golden eagles maintain home ranges or territories that may be as large as 200 km^{2} (77 sq mi). They build large nests in cliffs and other high places to which they may return for several breeding years. Most breeding activities take place in the spring; they are monogamous and may remain together for several years or possibly for life. Females lay up to four eggs, and then incubate them for six weeks. Typically, one or two young survive to fledge in about three months. These juvenile golden eagles usually attain full independence in the fall, after which they wander widely until establishing a territory for themselves in four to five years.

Once widespread across the Holarctic, it has disappeared from many areas that are heavily populated by humans. Despite being extirpated from or uncommon in some of its former range, the species is still widespread, being present in sizeable stretches of Eurasia, North America, and parts of North Africa. It is the largest and least populous of the five species of true accipitrid to occur as a breeding species in both the Palearctic and the Nearctic.

For centuries, this species has been one of the most highly regarded birds used in falconry. Because of its hunting prowess, the golden eagle is regarded with great mystic reverence in some ancient, tribal cultures. It is one of the most extensively studied species of raptor in the world in some parts of its range, such as the Western United States and the Western Palearctic.

== Taxonomy and systematics ==
This species was first described by Carl Linnaeus in his landmark 1758 10th edition of Systema Naturae as Falco chrysaetos. Since birds were grouped largely on superficial characteristics at that time, many species were grouped by Linnaeus into the genus Falco. The type locality was given simply as "Europa"; it was later restricted to Sweden. It was moved to the new genus Aquila by French ornithologist Mathurin Jacques Brisson in 1760. Aquila is Latin for "eagle", possibly derived from aquilus, "dark in colour" and chrysaetos is Ancient Greek for the golden eagle from khrusos, "gold" and aetos, "eagle".

The golden eagle is part of a broad group of raptors called "booted eagles" which are defined by the feature that all species have feathering over their tarsus, unlike many other accipitrids which have bare legs. Included in this group are all species described as "hawk eagles" including the genera Spizaetus and Nisaetus, as well as assorted monotypical genera such as Oroaetus, Lophaetus, Stephanoaetus, Polemaetus, Lophotriorchis and Ictinaetus.

The genus Aquila is distributed across every continent but for South America and Antarctica. Up to 20 species have been classified in the genus, but more recently the taxonomic placement of some of the traditional species has been questioned. Traditionally, the Aquila eagles have been grouped superficially as largish, mainly brownish or dark-colored booted eagles that vary little in transition from their juvenile to their adult plumages. Genetic research has recently indicated the golden eagle is included in a clade with Verreaux's eagle in Africa as well as the Gurney's eagle (A. gurneyi) and the wedge-tailed eagle (clearly part of an Australasian radiation of the lineage). This identification of this particular clade has long been suspected based on similar morphological characteristics amongst these large-bodied species. More surprisingly, the smaller, much paler-bellied sister species Bonelli's eagle (A. fasciatus) and African hawk-eagle (A. spilogaster), previously included in the genus Hieraaetus, have been revealed to be genetically much closer to the Verreaux's and golden eagle lineage than to other species traditionally included in the genus Aquila. Other largish Aquila species, the eastern imperial, the Spanish imperial, the tawny and the steppe eagles, are now thought to be separate, close-knit clade, which attained some similar characteristics to the prior clade via convergent evolution.

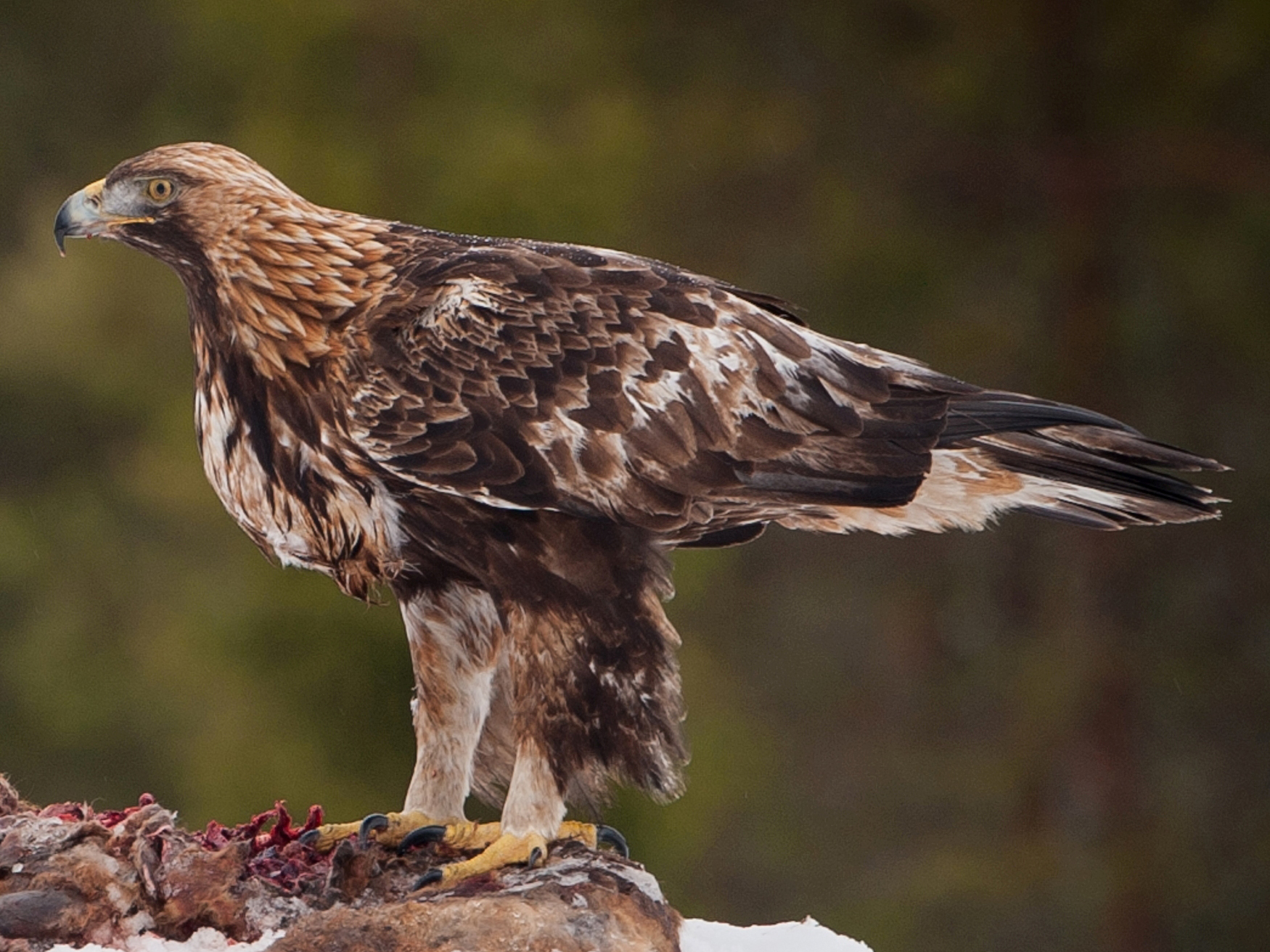
Wintering eagle of the nominate subspecies in Finland

Genetically, the "spotted eagles" (A. pomarina, hastata and clanga), have been discovered to be more closely related to the long-crested eagle (Lophaetus occipitalis) and the black eagle (Ictinaetus malayensis), and many generic reassignments have been advocated. The genus Hieraaetus, including the booted eagle (H. pennatus), little eagle (H. morphnoides) and Ayres's hawk-eagle (H. ayresii), consists of much smaller species, that are in fact smallest birds called eagles outside of the unrelated Spilornis serpent-eagle genus. This genus has recently been eliminated by many authorities and is now occasionally also included in Aquila, although not all ornithological unions have followed this suit in this re-classification. The small-bodied Wahlberg's eagle (H. wahlbergi) has been traditionally considered a Aquila species due to its lack of change from juvenile to adult plumage and brownish color but it is actually genetically aligned to the Hieraaetus lineage. Cassin's hawk-eagle (H. africanus) is also probably closely related to the Hieraaetus group rather than the Spizaetus/Nisaetus "hawk-eagle" group (in which it was previously classified) which is not known to have radiated to Africa.

=== Subspecies and distribution ===
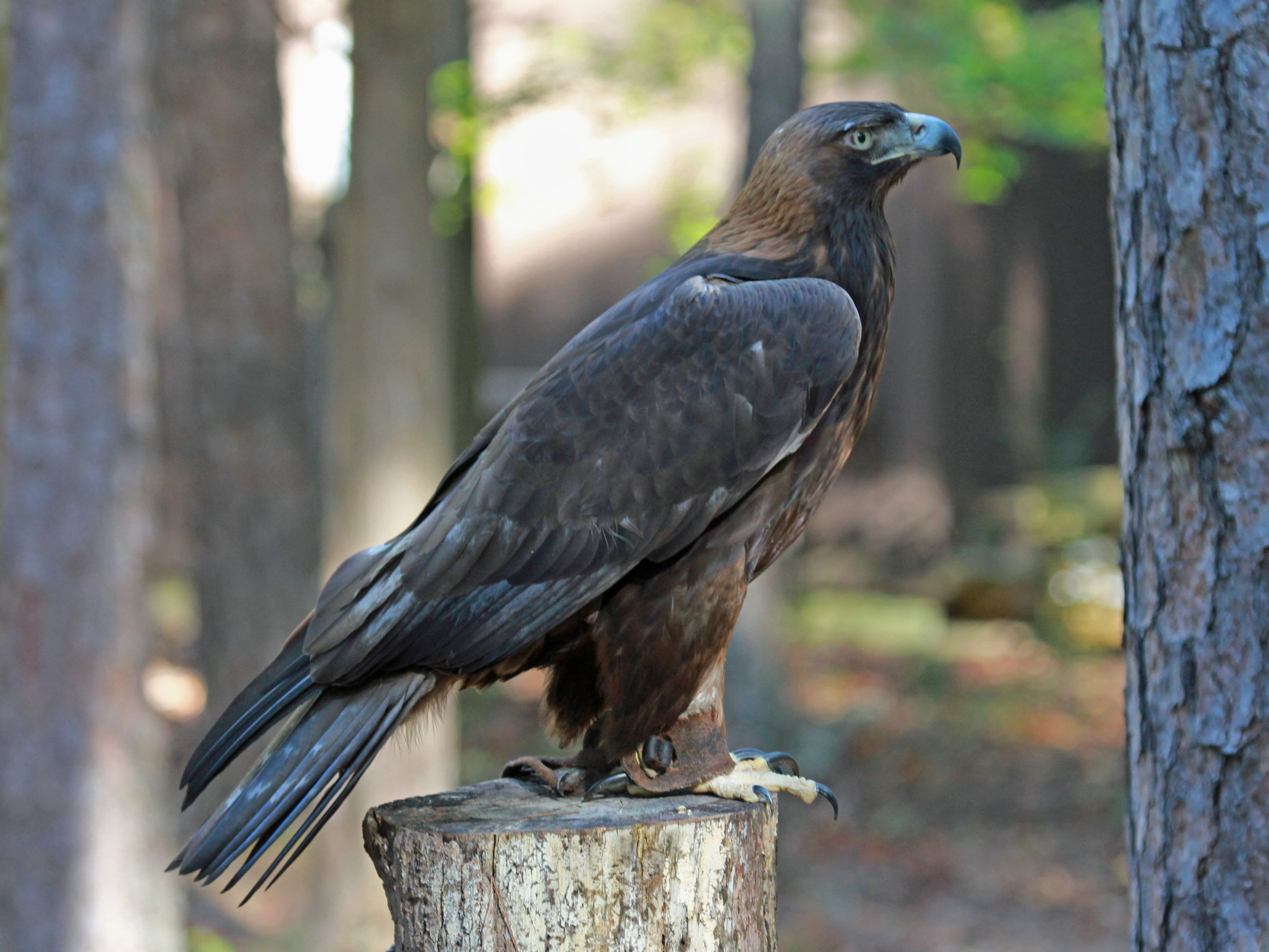
A captive Aquila chrysaetos canadensis shows the typical rusty coloration of the subspecies.

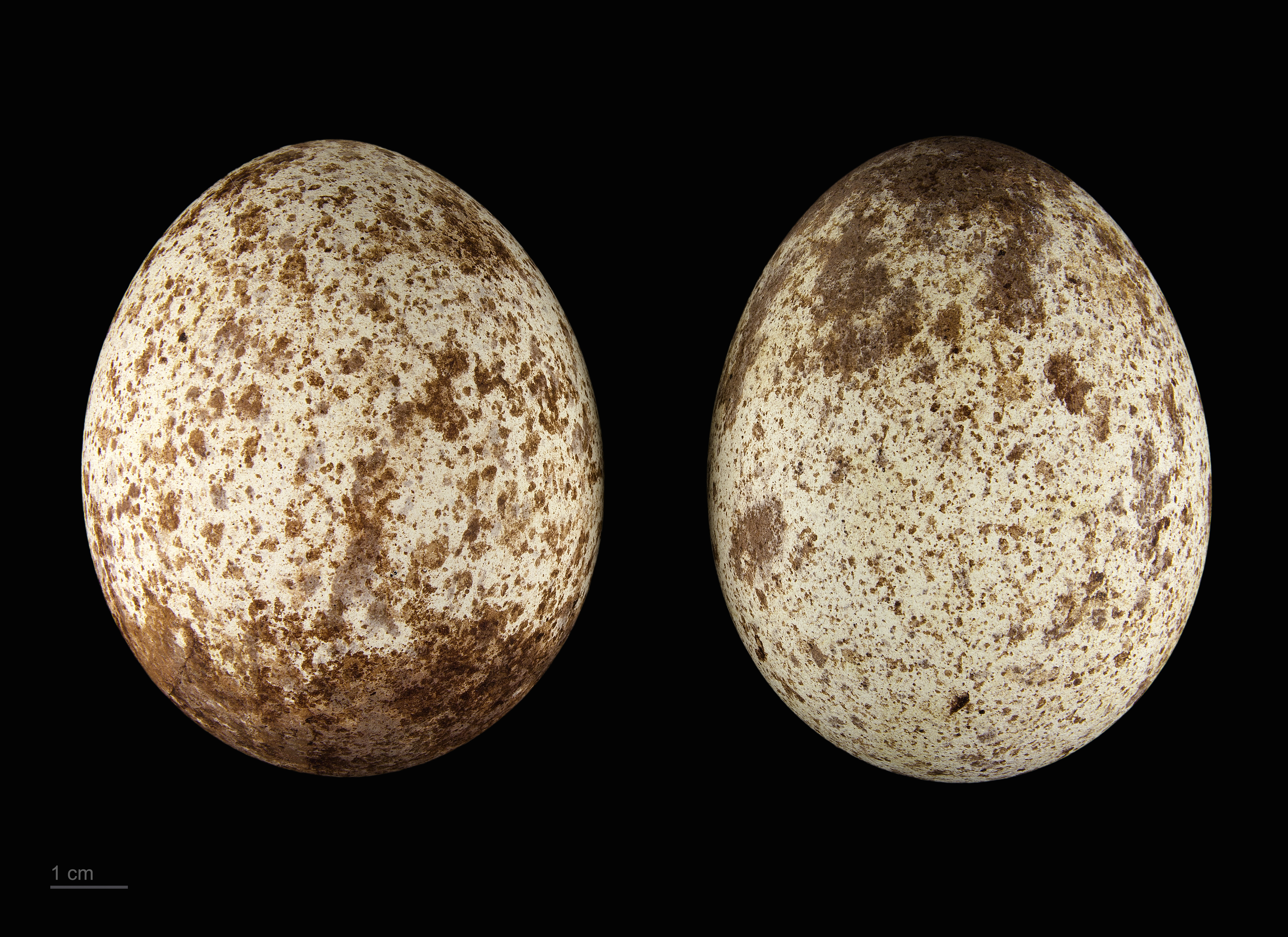
Aquila chrysaetos homeyeri – MHNT

There are six extant subspecies of golden eagle that differ slightly in size and plumage. Individuals of any of the subspecies are somewhat variable and the differences between the subspecies are clinal, especially in terms of body size. Other than these characteristics, there is little variation across the range of the species. Some recent studies have gone so far as to propose that only two subspecies be recognized based on genetic markers: Aquila chrysaetos chrysaetos (including A. c. homeyeri) and A. c. canadensis (including A. c. japonica, A. c. daphanea and A. c. kamtschatica).

- Aquila chrysaetos chrysaetos (Linnaeus, 1758) – sometimes referred to as the European golden eagle. This is the nominate subspecies. This subspecies is found almost throughout Europe, including the British Isles (mainly in Scotland), the majority of Scandinavia, southern and northernmost France, Italy and Austria. In Eastern Europe, it is found from Estonia to Romania, Greece, Serbia, Bulgaria and Kosovo in southeastern Europe. It is also distributed through European Russia, reportedly reaching its eastern limit around the Yenisei River in Russia, also ranging south at a similar longitude into western Kazakhstan and northern Iran. Male wing length is from 56.5 to 67 cm (22.2 to 26.4 in), averaging 62 cm (24 in), and female wing length is from 61.5 to 71.2 cm (24.2 to 28.0 in), averaging 67 cm (26 in). Males weigh from 2.8 to 4.6 kg (6.2 to 10.1 lb), averaging 3.69 kg (8.1 lb), and females weigh from 3.8 to 6.7 kg (8.4 to 14.8 lb), averaging 5.17 kg (11.4 lb). The male of this subspecies has a wingspan of 1.89 to 2.15 m (6 ft 2 in to 7 ft 1 in), with an average of 2.02 m (6 ft 8 in), with the female's typical wingspan range is 2.12 to 2.2 m (6 ft 11 in to 7 ft 3 in), with an average of 2.16 m (7 ft 1 in). This is a medium-sized subspecies and is the palest. As opposed to golden eagles found further east in Eurasia, the adults of this subspecies are a tawny golden-brown on the upperside. The nape patch is often gleaming golden in color and the feathers here are exceptionally long.
- Aquila chrysaetos homeyeri Severtzov, 1888 – commonly known as the Iberian golden eagle. This subspecies occurs in almost the entirety of the Iberian Peninsula as well as the island of Crete, though it is absent from the rest of continental Europe. It also ranges in North Africa in a narrow sub-coastal strip from Morocco to Tunisia. A completely isolated population of golden eagles is found in Ethiopia's Bale Mountains, at the southern limit of the species' range worldwide. Although this latter population has not been formally assigned to a subspecies, there is a high probability that it belongs with A. c. homeyeri. This subspecies also ranges in much of Asia Minor, mainly Turkey, spottily through the Middle East and the Arabian Peninsula into northern Yemen and Oman to its eastern limits throughout the Caucasus, much of Iran and north to southwestern Kazakhstan. Male wing length is from 55 to 64.3 cm (21.7 to 25.3 in), averaging 59 cm (23 in), and female wing length is from 60 to 70.5 cm (23.6 to 27.8 in), averaging 64 cm (25 in). Weight is from 2.9 to 6 kg (6.4 to 13.2 lb) with no known reports of average masses. This subspecies is slightly smaller and darker plumaged than the nominate subspecies, but it is not as dark as the golden eagles found further to the east. The forehead and crown are dark brownish, with the nape patch being short-feathered and a relatively light rusty color.
- Aquila chrysaetos daphanea Severtzov, 1888 – known variously as the Asian golden eagle, Himalayan golden eagle or berkut. This subspecies is distributed in central Kazakhstan, eastern Iran, and the easternmost Caucasus, distributed to Manchuria and central China and along the Himalayas from northern Pakistan to Bhutan and discontinuing in northeastern Myanmar (rarely ranging over into northernmost India). This subspecies is the largest on average. Male wing length is from 60 to 68 cm (24 to 27 in), averaging 64 cm (25 in), and female wing length is from 66 to 72 cm (26 to 28 in), averaging 70 cm (28 in). No range of body weights are known, but males will weigh approximately 4.05 kg (8.9 lb) and females 6.35 kg (14.0 lb). Although the wingspan of this subspecies reportedly averages 2.21 m (7 ft 3 in), some individuals can have much longer wings. One female berkut had an authenticated wingspan of 2.81 m (9 ft 3 in), although she was a captive specimen. It is generally the second-darkest subspecies, being blackish on the back. The forehead and crown are dark with a blackish cap near the end of the crown. The feathers of the nape and top-neck are rich brown-red. The nape feathers are slightly shorter than in the nominate subspecies and are similar in length to A. c. homeyeri.
- Aquila chrysaetos japonica Severtzov, 1888 – commonly known as the Japanese golden eagle. This subspecies is found in northern Japan (the islands of Honshu, Hokkaido and discontinuously in Kyushu) and undefined parts of Korea. Male wing length is from 58 to 59.5 cm (22.8 to 23.4 in), averaging 59 cm (23 in), and female wing length is from 62 to 64.5 cm (24.4 to 25.4 in), averaging 63 cm (25 in). No range of body weights are known, but males will weigh approximately 2.5 kg (5.5 lb) and females 3.25 kg (7.2 lb). This is, by far, the smallest-bodied subspecies. It is also the darkest, with even adults being a slaty-grayish black on the back and crown and juveniles being similar, but with darker black plumage contrasting with brownish color and white scaling on the wings, flank and tail. This subspecies has bright rufous nape feathers that are quite loose and long. Adult Japanese golden eagles often maintain extensive white mottling on the inner-webs of the tail that tend to be more typical of juvenile eagles in other subspecies.
- Aquila chrysaetos canadensis (Linnaeus, 1758) – commonly known as the North American golden eagle. Occupies the species' entire range in North America, which comprises the great majority of Alaska, western Canada, Western United States and Mexico. The species is found breeding occasionally in all Canadian provinces but for Nova Scotia. It is currently absent in the Eastern United States as breeding species east of a line from North Dakota down through westernmost Nebraska and Oklahoma to West Texas. The southern limits of its range are in central Mexico, from the Guadalajara area in the west to the Tampico area in the east; it is the "Mexican eagle" featured on the coat of arms of Mexico. It is the subspecies with the largest breeding range and is probably the most numerous subspecies, especially if A. c. kamtschatica is included. Male wing length is from 59.1 to 64 cm (23.3 to 25.2 in), averaging 61 cm (24 in), and female wing length is from 60.1 to 67.4 cm (23.7 to 26.5 in), averaging 65 cm (26 in). The average wingspan in both sexes is about 2.04 m (6 ft 8 in). Males weigh from 2.5 to 4.47 kg (5.5 to 9.9 lb), averaging 3.48 kg (7.7 lb), and females typically weigh from 3.6 to 6.4 kg (7.9 to 14.1 lb), averaging 4.91 kg (10.8 lb). The subspecies does not appear to follow Bergmann's rule (the rule that widely distributed organisms are larger-bodied further away from the Equator), as specimens of both sexes from Idaho had a mean weight of 4.22 kg (9.3 lb) and where slightly heavier than those from Alaska, with a mean weight of 3.76 kg (8.3 lb). It is medium-sized, being generally intermediate in size between the nominate and A. c. homeyeri, but with much overlap. It is blackish to dark brown on the back. The long feathers of the nape and top-neck are rusty-reddish and slightly narrower and darker than in the nominate subspecies.
- Aquila chrysaetos kamtschatica Severtzov, 1888 – sometimes referred to as the Siberian golden eagle or the Kamchatkan golden eagle. This subspecies ranges from Western Siberia (where overlap with A. c. chrysaetos is probable), across most of Russia, including the Altay (spilling over into Northern Mongolia), to the Kamchatka Peninsula and the Anadyrsky District. This subspecies is often included in A. c. canadensis. Male wing length is from 61.8 to 70.5 cm (24.3 to 27.8 in), averaging 64 cm (25 in), and female wing length is from 65 to 72 cm (26 to 28 in), averaging 69 cm (27 in). No weights are known in this subspecies. The coloration of these eagles is almost exactly the same as in A. c. canadensis. The main difference is that this subspecies is much larger in size, being nearly the equal of A. c. daphanea if going on wing-length.

The larger Middle Pleistocene golden eagles of France (and possibly elsewhere) are referred to a paleosubspecies Aquila chrysaetos bonifacti, and the huge specimens of the Late Pleistocene of Liko Cave (Crete) have been named Aquila chrysaetos simurgh (Weesie, 1988). Similarly, an ancestral golden eagle, with a heavier, broader skull, larger wings and shorter legs when compared to modern birds, has been found in the La Brea Tar Pits of southern California.

== Description ==
=== Size ===
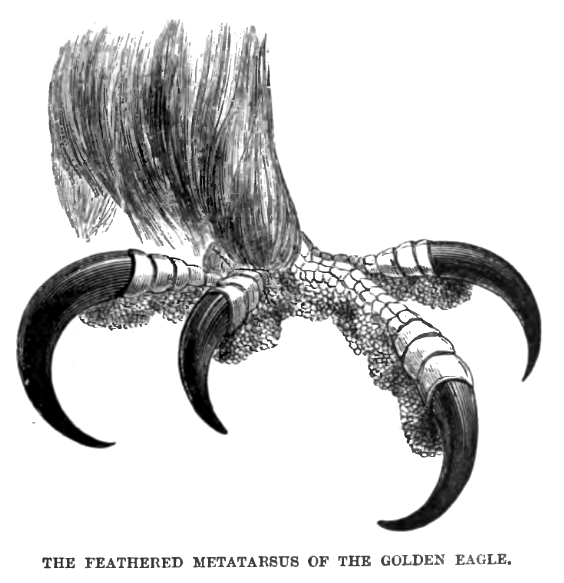
The foot and talons of a golden eagle

The golden eagle is a very large raptor, 66 to 102 centimetres (26 to 40 in) in length. Its wings are broad and the wingspan is 1.8 to 2.34 metres (5 ft 11 in to 7 ft 8 in). The wingspan of golden eagles is the fifth largest among living eagle species. Females are larger than males, with a bigger difference in larger subspecies. Females of the large Himalayan golden eagles are about 37% heavier than males and have nearly 9% longer wings, whereas in the smaller Japanese golden eagles, females are only 26% heavier with around 6% longer wings. In the largest subspecies (A. c. daphanea), males and females weigh typically 4.05 and 6.35 kg (8.9 and 14.0 lb), respectively. In the smallest subspecies, A. c. japonica, males weigh 2.5 kg (5.5 lb) and females 3.25 kg (7.2 lb). In the species overall, males average around 3.6 kg (7.9 lb) and females around 5.1 kg (11 lb).

The maximum size of golden eagles is debated. Large subspecies are the heaviest representatives of the genus Aquila and this species is on average the seventh-heaviest living eagle species. The golden eagle is the second heaviest breeding eagle in North America, Europe and Africa and the fourth heaviest in Asia. For some time, the largest known mass authenticated for a wild female was the specimen from the A. c. chrysaetos subspecies which weighed around 6.7 kg (15 lb) and spanned 2.55 m (8 ft 4 in) across the wings. American golden eagles are typically somewhat smaller than the large Eurasian species, but a massive female that was banded and released in 2006 around Wyoming's Bridger-Teton National Forest became the heaviest wild golden eagle on record, at 7.7 kg (17 lb). Captive birds have been measured with a wingspan of 2.81 m (9 ft 3 in) and a mass of 12.1 kg (27 lb), though this mass was for an eagle bred for falconry, which tend to be unnaturally heavy.

The standard measurements of the species include a wing chord length of 52–72 cm (20–28 in), a tail length of 26.5–38 cm (10.4–15.0 in) and a tarsus length of 9.4–12.2 cm (3.7–4.8 in). The culmen (upper ridge of beak) reportedly averages around 4.5 cm (1.8 in), with a range of 3.6 to 5 cm (1.4 to 2.0 in). The bill length from the gape measures around 6 cm (2.4 in). The long, straight and powerful hallux-claw (hind claw) can range from 4.5 to 6.34 cm (1.77 to 2.50 in), about one centimetre longer than in a bald eagle and a little more than one centimetre less than a harpy eagle.

=== Colour ===
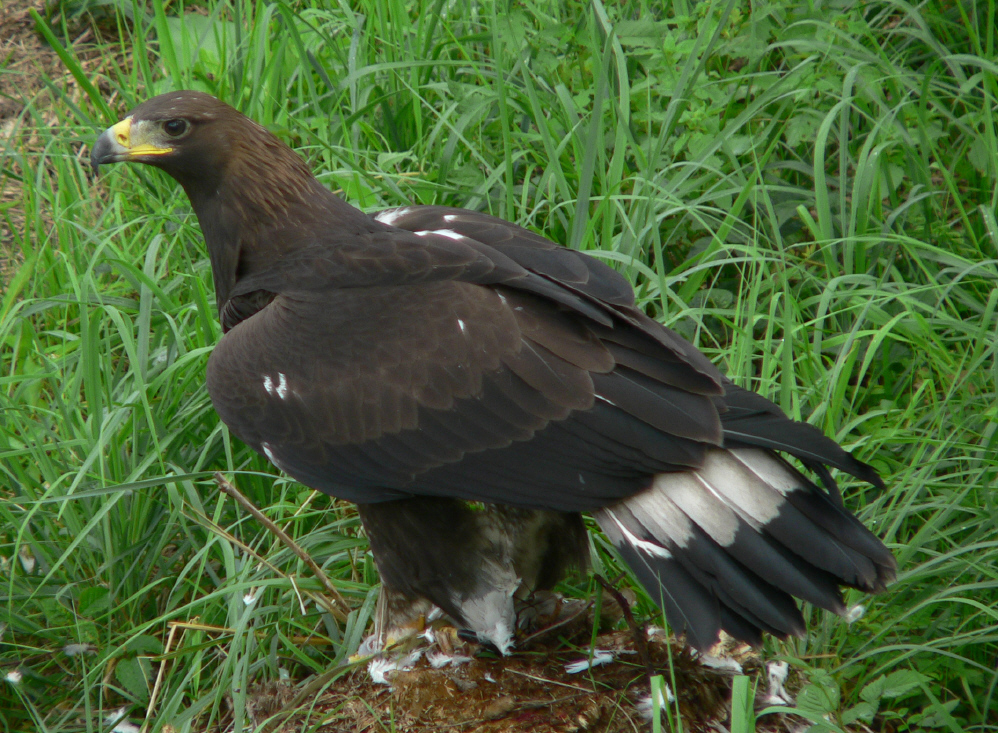
Subadult, showing white in tail and dark neck

Adults of both sexes have similar plumage and are primarily dark brown, with some grey on the inner wing and tail, and a paler, typically golden colour on the back of the crown and nape that gives the species its common name. Unlike other Aquila species, where the tarsal feathers are typically similar in colour to the rest of the plumage, the tarsal feathers of golden eagles tend to be paler, ranging from light golden to white. In addition, some full-grown birds (especially in North America) have white "epaulettes" on the upper part of each scapular feather tract. The bill is dark at the tip, fading to a lighter horn colour, with a yellow cere. As in many accipitrids, the bare portion of the feet is yellow. There are subtle differences in colouration among subspecies, described below.

Juvenile golden eagles are similar to adults but tend to be darker, appearing black on the back especially in East Asia. They have a less faded colour. Young birds are white for about two-thirds of their tail length, ending with a broad, black band. Occasionally, juvenile eagles have white patches on the remiges at the bases of the inner primaries and the outer secondaries, forming a crescent marking on the wings which tends to be divided by darker feathers. Rarely, juvenile birds may have only traces of white on the tail. Compared to the relatively consistently white tail, the white patches on the wing are extremely variable; some juveniles have almost no white visible. Juveniles of less than 12 months of age tend to have the most white in their plumage. By their second summer, the white underwing coverts are usually replaced by a characteristic rusty brown colour. By the third summer, the upper-wing coverts are largely replaced by dark brown feathers, although not all feathers moult at once which leaves many juvenile birds with a grizzled pattern. The tail follows a similar pattern of maturation to the wings. Due to the variability between individuals, juvenile eagles cannot be reliably aged by sight alone. Many golden eagles still have white on the tail during their first attempt at nesting. The final adult plumage is not fully attained until the birds are between 5 1/2 and 6 1/2 years old.

=== Moulting ===
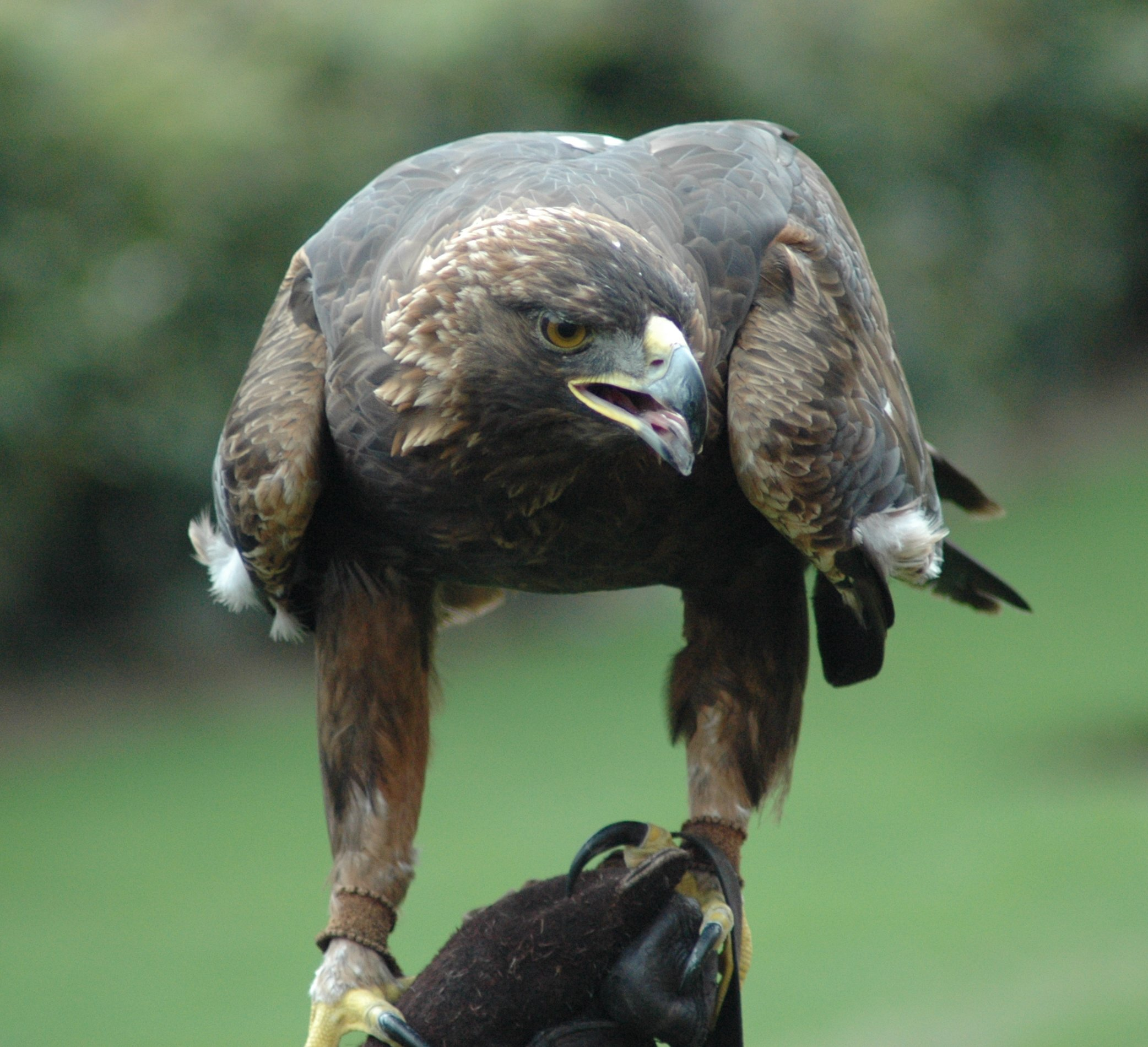
Captive adult of the North American subspecies Aquila chrysaetos canadensis

This species moults gradually beginning in March or April until September or October each year. Moulting usually decreases in winter. Moult of the contour feathers begins on the head and neck region and progresses along the feather tracts in a general front-to-back direction. Feathers on head, neck, back and scapulars may be replaced annually. With large feathers of the wing and tail, moult begins with the innermost feathers and proceeds outwards in a straightforward manner known as "descendant" moult.

=== Vocalisations ===
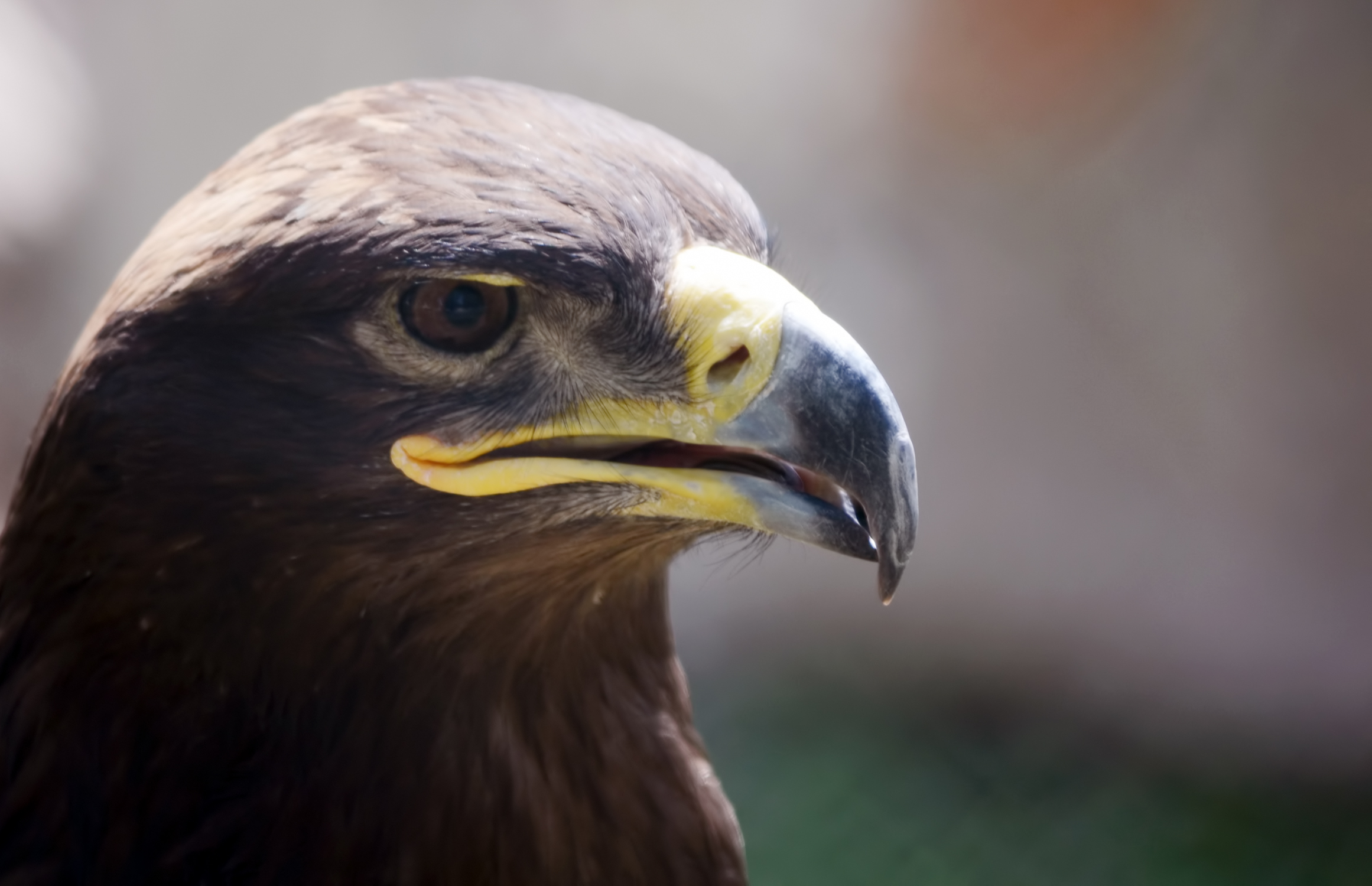
Golden eagles are often silent.

While many accipitrids are not known for their strong voices, golden eagles have a particular tendency for silence, even while breeding. That being said, some vocalization has been recorded, usually centering around the nesting period. The voice of the golden eagle is considered weak, high, and shrill, has been called "quite pathetic" and "puppy-like", and seems incongruous with the formidable size and nature of the species. Most known vocalisations seem to function as contact calls between eagles, sometimes adults to their offspring, occasionally territorial birds to intruders and rarely between a breeding pair. In western Montana, nine distinct calls were noted: a chirp, a seeir, a pssa, a skonk, a cluck, a wonk, a honk and a hiss.

=== Flight ===
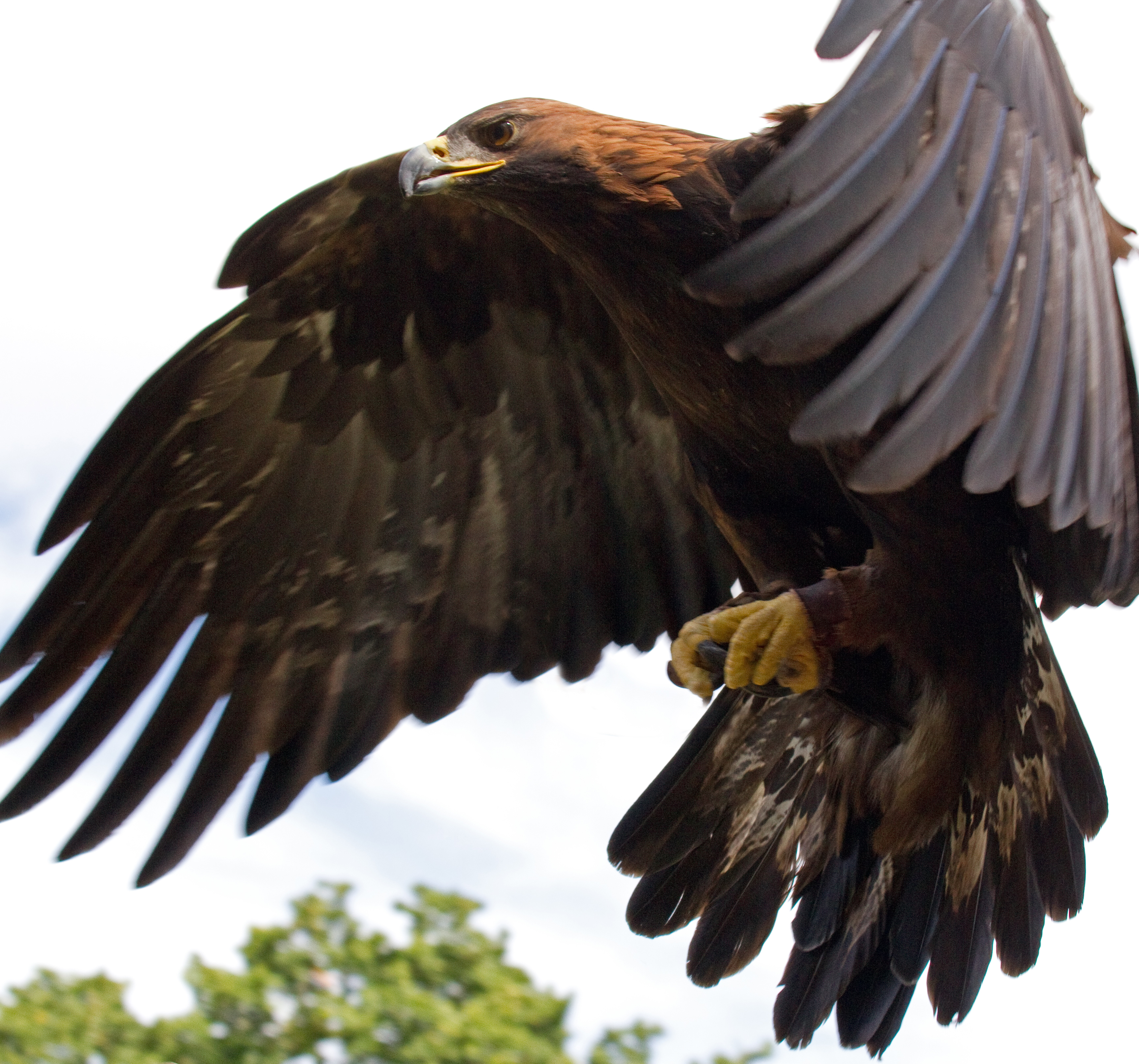
In flight

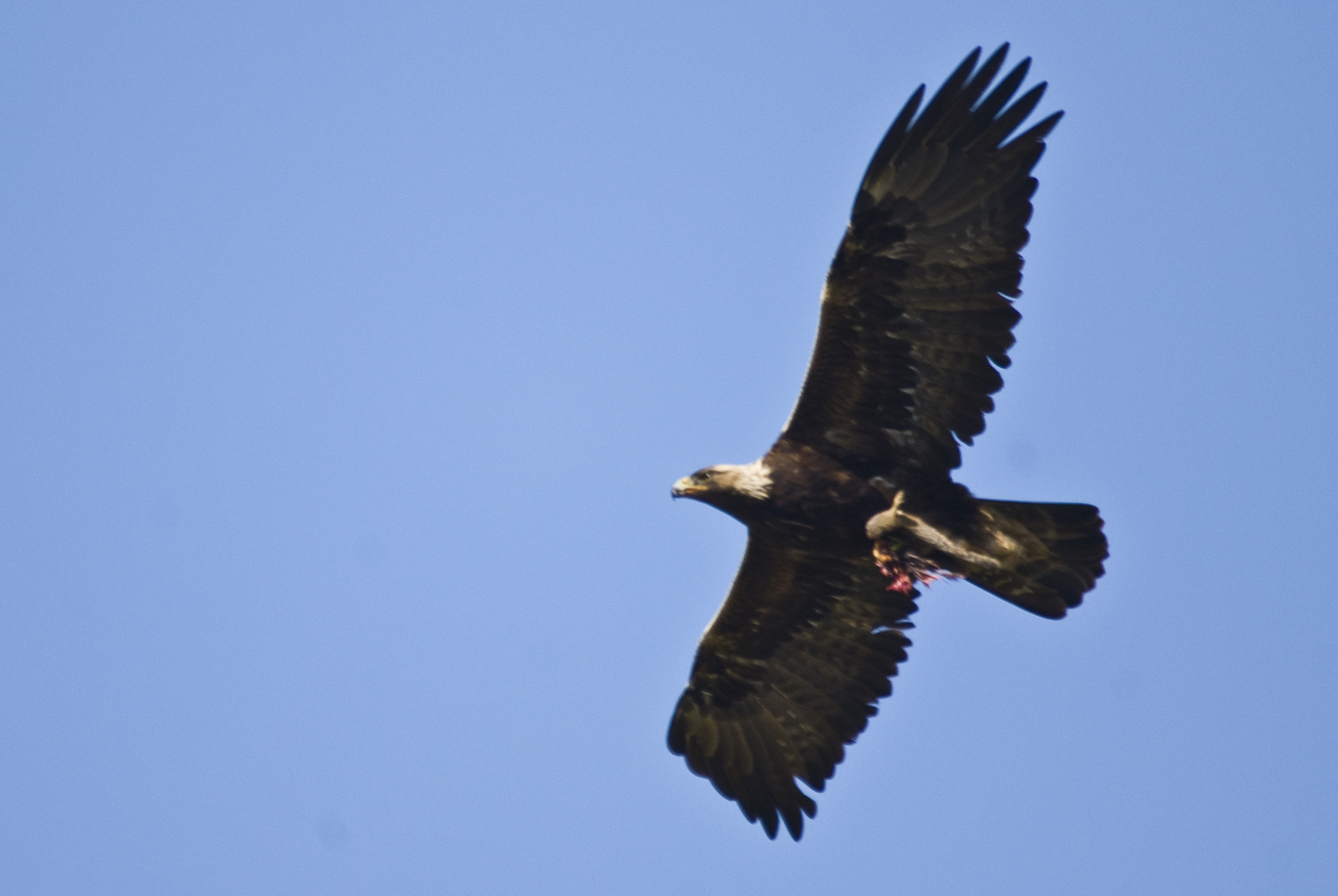
Golden eagle flying in dihedral with food

Golden eagles are sometimes considered the best fliers among eagles and perhaps among all raptorial birds. They are equipped with broad, long wings with somewhat finger-like indentations on the tips of the wing. Golden eagles are unique among their genus in that they often fly in a slight dihedral, which means the wings are often held in a slight, upturned V-shape. When they need to flap, golden eagles appear at their most laboured, but this is less common than soaring or gliding. Flapping flight usually consists of 6–8 deep wing-beats, interspersed with 2–3 second glides. While soaring, the wings and tail are held in one plane with the primary tips often spread.

A typical, unhurried soaring speed in golden eagles is around 45–52 kilometres per hour (28–32 mph). When hunting or displaying, the golden eagle can glide very fast, reaching speeds of up to 190 kilometres per hour (120 mph). When stooping (diving) in the direction of prey or during territorial displays, the eagle holds its legs up against its tail, and holds its wings tight and partially closed against its body. When diving after prey, a golden eagle can reach 240 to 320 kilometres per hour (150 to 200 mph). Although less agile and manoeuvrable, the golden eagle is apparently quite the equal and possibly even the superior of the peregrine falcon's stooping and gliding speeds. This makes the golden eagle one of the two fastest living animals. Although most flight in golden eagles has a clear purpose (e.g., territoriality, hunting), some flights, such as those by solitary birds or between well-established breeding pairs, seem to be play.

=== Distinguishing from other species ===
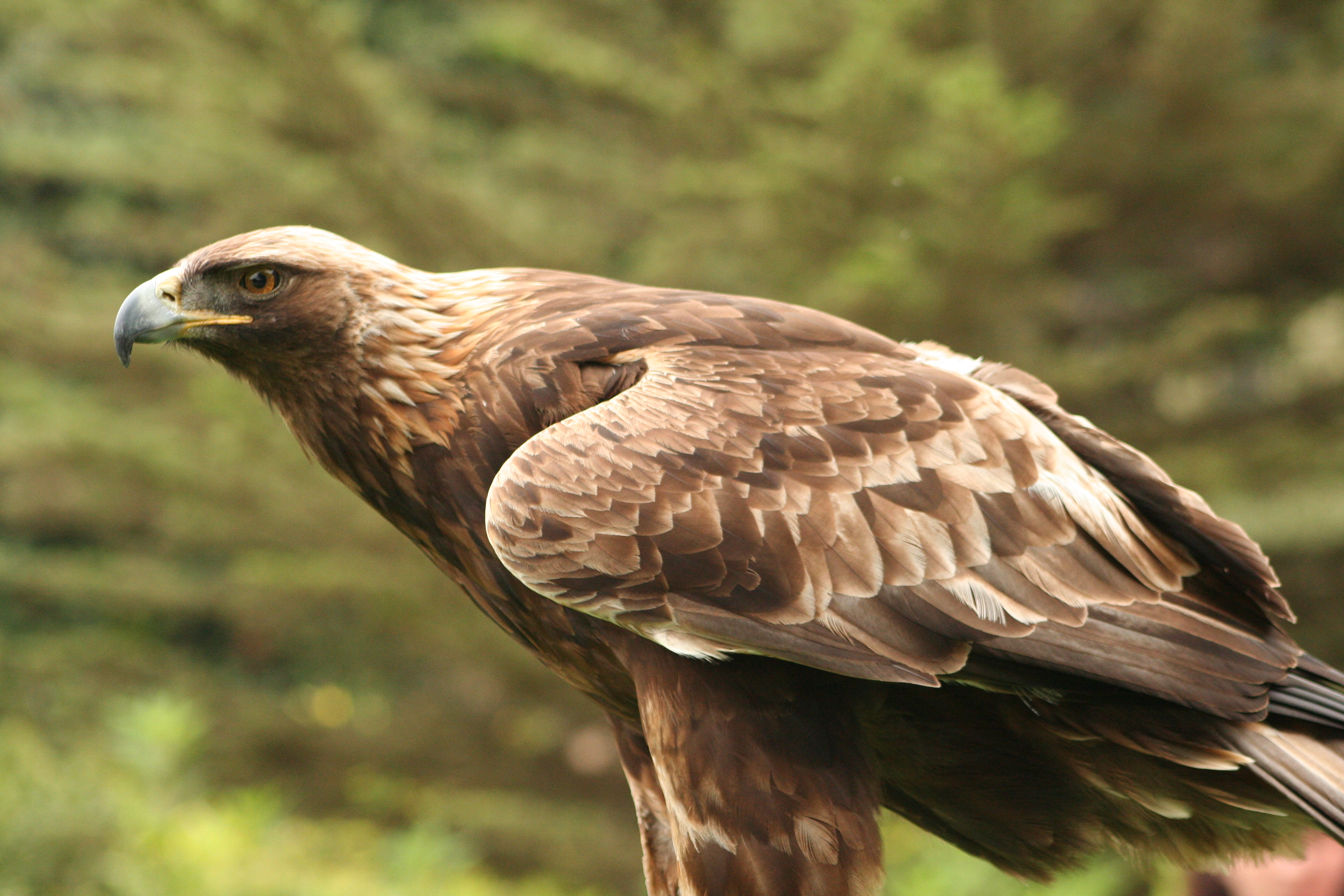
Golden eagles are readily distinguished by their brown plumage, paler than most other Aquila, and pale nape patch.

Size readily distinguishes this species from most other raptors when it is seen well. Most other raptors are considerably smaller. Buteo hawks, which are perhaps most similar to the golden eagle in structure among the species outside of the "booted eagle" group, are often counted among the larger very common raptors. However, a mid-sized Buteo is dwarfed by a golden eagle, as an adult female eagle has about double the wingspan and about five times the weight. Buteos are also usually distinctly paler below, although some species occur in dark morphs which can be darker than a golden eagle.

Among raptorial birds that share the golden eagle's range, only some Old World vultures and the California condor are distinctly larger, with longer, broader wings, typically held more evenly in a slower, less forceful flight; they often have dramatically different colour patterns. In North America, the golden eagle may be confused with the turkey vulture from a great distance, as it is a large species that, like the golden eagle, often flies with a pronounced dihedral. The turkey vulture can be distinguished by its less controlled, forceful flying style (they frequently rock back and forth unsteadily in even moderate winds) and its smaller, thinner body, much smaller head and, at closer range, its slaty black-brown colour and silvery wing secondaries.

Compared to Haliaeetus eagles, the golden eagle has wings that are only somewhat more slender but are more hawk-like and lack the flat, plank-like wing positioning seen in the other genus. Large northern Haliaeetus species usually have a larger bill and larger head which protrudes more distinctly than a golden eagle's in flight. The tail of the golden eagle is longer on average than those of Haliaeetus eagles, appearing to be two or three times the length of the head in soaring flight, whereas in the other eagles the head is often more than twice the length of the tail. Confusion is most likely between juvenile Haliaeetus and golden eagles, as the adult golden has a more solidly golden-brown coloration and all Haliaeetus eagles have obvious distinctive plumages as adults. Haliaeetus eagles are often heavily streaked in their juvenile phase. Juvenile golden eagles can have large patches of white on their wings and tail that are quite different from the random, sometimes large and splotchy-looking distribution of white typical of juvenile Haliaeetus.

Distinguishing the golden eagle from other Aquila eagles in Eurasia is more difficult. Identification may rely on the golden eagle's relatively long tail and patterns of white or grey on the wings and tail. Unlike golden eagles, other Aquila eagles do not generally fly in a pronounced dihedral. At close range, the golden to rufous nape-shawl of the golden eagle is distinctive from other Aquila. Most other Aquila eagles have darker plumage, although the smaller tawny eagle is often paler than the golden eagle (the overlap in range is verified only in Bale Mountains, Ethiopia). Among Eurasian Aquila, the adult eastern imperial and Spanish imperial eagle come closest to reaching the size of golden eagles, but both are distinguished by their longer necks, flatter wings in flight, white markings on their shoulder forewing-coverts, paler cream-straw coloured nape patch and generally darker colouration. Juvenile imperial eagles are much paler overall (caramel-cream in the Spanish; cream and tawny streaks in the eastern) and are not likely to be confused.

Steppe eagles can also approach golden eagles in size but are more compact and smaller headed with little colour variation to their dark earth-brown plumage, apart from juvenile birds which have distinctive cream-coloured bands running through their coverts and secondaries. Verreaux's eagles are most similar in size and body shape to the golden, the body of the Verreaux's eagle being slightly longer overall but marginally less heavy and long-winged than the golden eagle's. The plumage is very distinctly different, however, as Verreaux's eagles are almost entirely jet-black except for some striking, contrasting white on the wing primaries, shoulders and upper-wing. This closely related species is known to co-occur with the golden eagle only in the Bale Mountains of Ethiopia. Other booted eagles in the golden eagle's range are unlikely to be confused due to differences in size and form. The only species in the genus Aquila that exceeds the golden eagle in average wingspan and length is the wedge-tailed eagle of Australasia; however, the wedge-tailed eagle is a slightly less heavy bird.

== Habitat and distribution ==
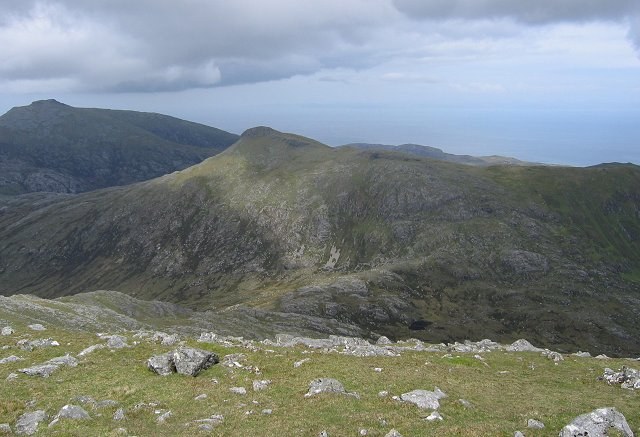
Beinn Mhor on the Isle of Mull, Scotland, is typical golden eagle habitat: rugged and mountainous.

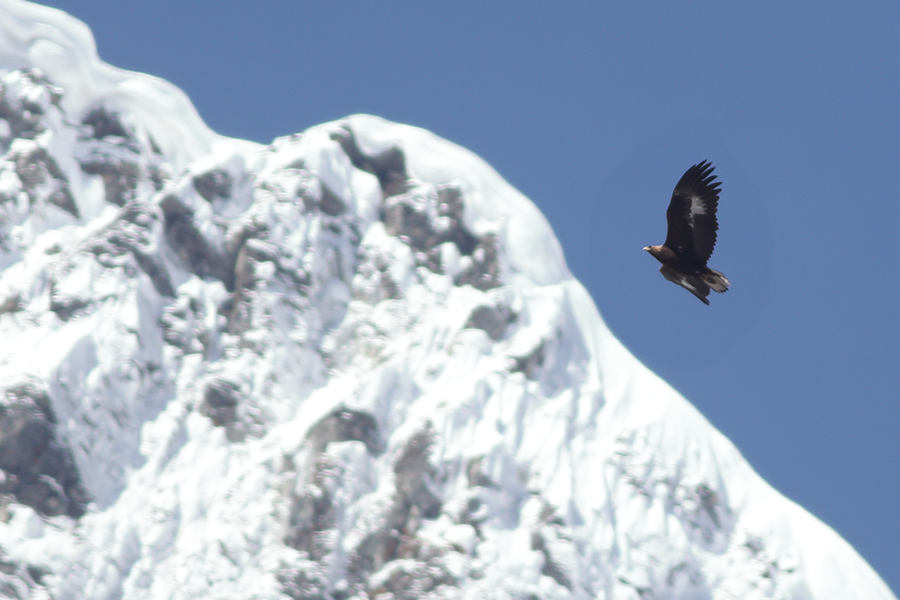
An adult flying above Himalayan mountains from Shingba Rhododendron Sanctuary in Sikkim, India

Golden eagles are fairly adaptable in habitat but often reside in areas with a few shared ecological characteristics. They are best suited to hunting in open or semi-open areas and search them out year-around. Native vegetation seems to be attractive to them and they typically avoid developed areas of any type from urban to agricultural as well as heavily forested regions. In desolate areas (e.g., the southern Yukon), they can occur regularly at roadkills and garbage dumps. The largest numbers of golden eagles are found in mountainous regions today, with many eagles doing a majority of their hunting and nesting on rock formations. However, they are not solely tied to high elevations and can breed in lowlands if the local habitats are suitable. Below are more detailed descriptions of habitats occupied by golden eagles in both continents where they occur.

=== Eurasia ===
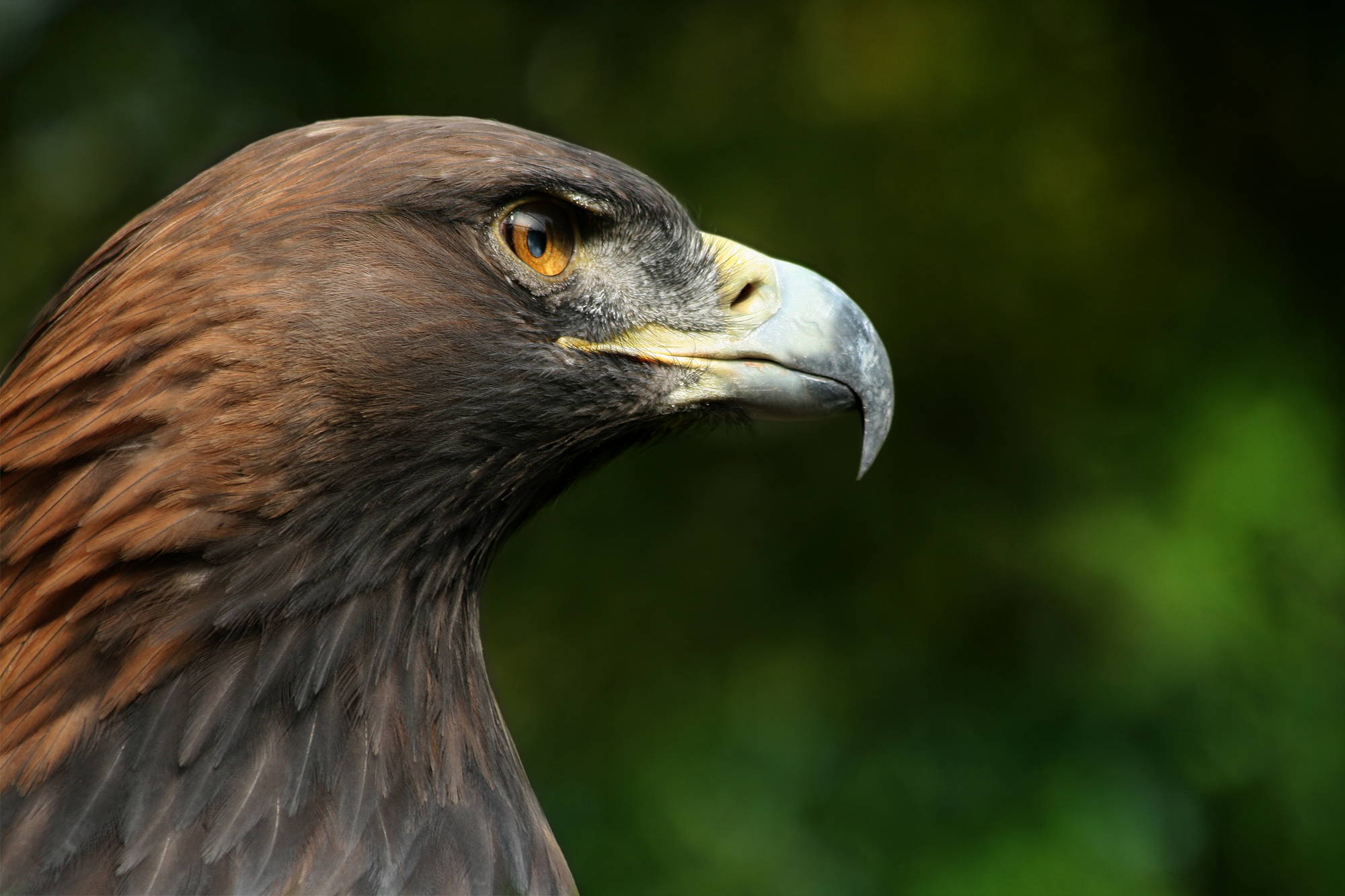
Portrait of a golden eagle near the Alps

In the Arctic fringe of Eurasia, golden eagles occur along the edge of the tundra and the taiga from the Kola Peninsula to Anadyr in eastern Siberia, nesting in forests and hunting over nearby arctic heathland. Typical vegetation is stunted, fragmented larch woodland merging into low birch-willow scrub and various heathland. In the rocky, wet, windy maritime climate of Scotland, Ireland, and western Scandinavia, the golden eagle dwells in mountains. These areas include upland grasslands, blanket bog, and sub-Arctic heaths but also fragmented woodland and woodland edge, including boreal forests. In Western Europe, golden eagle habitat is dominated by open, rough grassland, heath and bogs, and rocky ridges, spurs, crags, scree, slopes and grand plateaux. In Sweden, Finland, the Baltic States, Belarus and almost the entire distribution in Russia all the way to the Pacific Ocean, golden eagles occur sparsely in lowland taiga forest. These areas are dominated by stands of evergreens such as pine, larch and spruce, occasionally supplemented by birch and alder stands in southern Scandinavia and the Baltic States. This is largely marginal country for golden eagles and they occur where tree cover is thin and abuts open habitat. Golden eagle taiga habitat usually consists of extensive peatland formations caused by poorly drained soils.

In central Europe, golden eagles today occur almost exclusively in the major mountain ranges, such as the Pyrenees, Alps, Carpathians, and the Caucasus. Here, the species nests near the tree line and hunt subalpine and alpine pastures, grassland and heath above. Golden eagles also occur in moderately mountainous habitat along the Mediterranean Sea, from the Iberian Peninsula and the Atlas Mountains in Morocco, to Greece, Turkey and Iraq. This area is characterized by low mountains, Mediterranean maquis vegetation, and sub-temperate open woodland. The local pine-oak vegetation, with a variety of Sclerophyllous shrubs are well-adapted to prolonged summer droughts. From Turkey and the southern Caspian Sea to the foothills of the Hindu Kush Mountains in Afghanistan, the typical golden eagle habitat is temperate desert-like mountain ranges surrounded by steppe landscapes interspersed with forest. Here the climate is colder and more continental than around the Mediterranean.

Golden eagles occupy the alpine ranges from the Altai Mountains and the Pamir Mountains to Tibet, in the great Himalayan massif, and Xinjiang, China, where they occupy the Tien Shan range. In these mountain ranges, the species often lives at very high elevations, living above tree line at more than 2,500 m (8,200 ft), often nesting in rocky scree and hunting in adjacent meadows. In Tibet, golden eagles inhabit high ridges and passes in the Lhasa River watershed, where they regularly join groups of soaring Himalayan vultures (Gyps himalayensis). One golden eagle was recorded circling at 6,190 m (20,310 ft) above sea-level in Khumbu in May 1975. In the mountains of Japan and Korea, the golden eagle occupies deciduous scrub woodland and carpet-like stands of Siberian dwarf pine (Pinus pumila) that merge into grasslands and alpine heathland.

The golden eagle occurs in mountains from the Adrar Plateau in Mauritania to northern Yemen and Oman where the desert habitat is largely bereft of vegetation but offers many rocky plateaus to support both the eagles and their prey. In Israel, their habitat is mainly rocky slopes and wide wadi areas, chiefly in desert and to a lesser extent in semi-desert and Mediterranean climates, extending to open areas. In Northeastern Africa, the habitat is often of a sparse, desert-like character and is quite similar to the habitat in Middle East and the Arabian peninsula. In Ethiopia's Bale Mountains, where the vegetation is more lush and the climate is clearly less arid than in Northeastern Africa, the golden eagle occupies verdant mountains.

=== North America ===
The biomes occupied by golden eagles are roughly concurrent with those of Eurasia. In western and northern Alaska and northern Canada to the Ungava Peninsula in Quebec, the eagles occupy the Arctic fringe of North America (the species does not range into the true high Arctic tundra), where open canopy gives way to dwarf-shrub heathland with cottongrass and tussock tundra. In land-locked areas of the sub-Arctic, golden eagles are by far the largest raptor. From the Alaska Range to Washington and Oregon, it is often found in high mountains above the tree line or on bluffs and cliffs along river valleys below the tree line. In Washington state, golden eagles can be found in clear-cut sections of otherwise dense coniferous forest zones with relatively little annual precipitation. From east of the Canadian Rocky Mountains to the mountains of Labrador, the golden eagle is found in small numbers in boreal forest peatlands and similar mixed woodland areas. In the foothills of the Rocky Mountains in the United States are plains and prairies where golden eagles are widespread, especially where there is a low human presence. Here, grassland on low rolling hills and flat plains are typical, interrupted only by cottonwood stands around river valleys and wetlands where the eagles may build their nests.

Golden eagles also occupy the desert-like Great Basin from southern Idaho to northern Arizona and New Mexico. In this habitat, trees are generally absent other than junipers with vegetation being dominated by sagebrush (Artemisia) and other low shrub species. Although the vegetation varies a bit more, similar habitat is occupied by golden eagles in Mexico. However, golden eagles are typically absent in North America from true deserts, like the Sonora Desert, where annual precipitation is less than 20 cm (7.9 in). Golden eagles occupy the mountains and coastal areas of California and Baja California in Mexico where hot, dry summers and moist winters are typical. The golden eagles here often nest in chaparral and oak woodland, oak savanna and grassland amongst low rolling hill typified by diverse vegetation. In the Eastern United States, the species once bred widely in the Appalachian Plateau near burns, open marshes, meadows, bogs and lakes. In Eastern North America, the species still breeds on the Gaspe Peninsula, Quebec. Until 1999, a pair of golden eagles were still known to nest in Maine but they are now believed to be absent as a breeding bird from the Eastern United States. The golden eagles who breed in eastern Canada winter on montane grass and heath fields in the Appalachian Plateau region, especially in Pennsylvania, New York, West Virginia, Maryland and Virginia. Most sightings in the Eastern United States recently are concentrated within or along southwestern border of the Appalachian Plateau (30% of records) and within the Coastal Plain physiographic region (33% of records).

Though they do regularly nest in the marsh-like peatland of the boreal forest, golden eagles are not generally associated with wetlands and, in fact, they can be found near some of the most arid spots on earth. In the wintering population of Eastern United States, however, they are often associated with steep river valleys, reservoirs, and marshes in inland areas as well as estuarine marshlands, barrier islands, managed wetlands, sounds, and mouths of major river systems in coastal areas. These wetlands are attractive due to a dominance of open vegetation, large concentrations of prey, and the general absence of human disturbance. In the midwestern United States, they are not uncommon during winter near reservoirs and wildlife refuges that provide foraging opportunities at waterfowl concentrations.

== Feeding ==
Golden eagles usually hunt during daylight hours, but were recorded hunting from one hour before sunrise to one hour after sunset during the breeding season in southwestern Idaho. The hunting success rate of golden eagles was calculated in Idaho, showing that, out of 115 hunting attempts, 20% were successful in procuring prey. A fully-grown golden eagle requires about 230 to 250 g (8.1 to 8.8 oz) of food per day but in the life of most eagles there are cycles of feast and famine, and eagles have been known to go without food for up to a week and then gorge on up to 900 g (2.0 lb) in one sitting.

The diet of golden eagles is composed primarily of small mammals such as rabbits, hares, ground squirrels, prairie dogs, and marmots. They also eat other birds (usually of medium size, such as gamebirds), reptiles, and fish in smaller numbers. Golden eagles occasionally capture larger prey, including seals, ungulates, coyotes, and badgers. They have also been known to capture large flying birds such as geese or cranes, as well as other raptors, including owls and falcons.

== Activity and movements ==
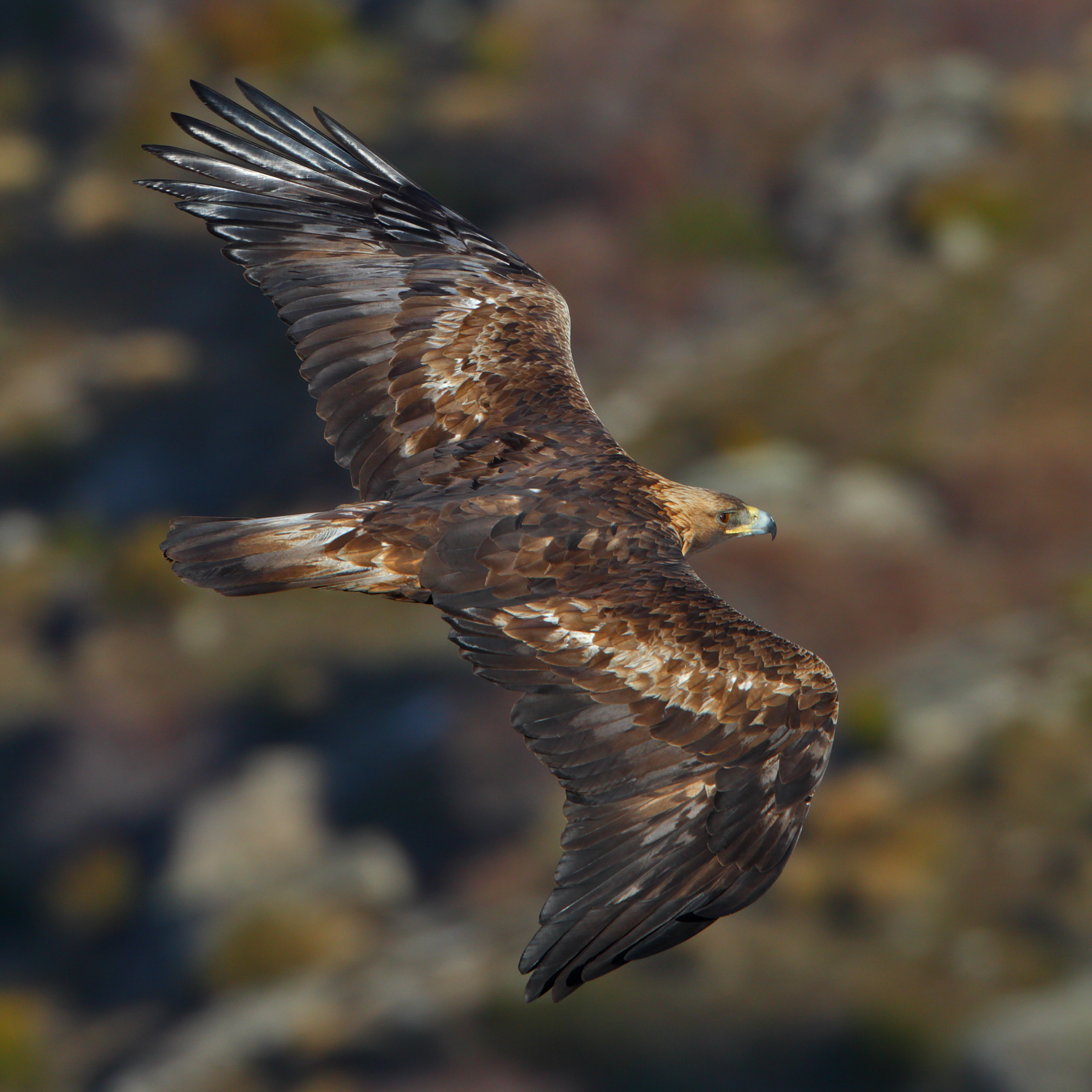
In Spain, golden eagles such as this one in the Province of Ávila are sedentary.

In Idaho, adult male golden eagles were observed to sit awake on a perch for an average of 78% of daylight, whereas adult females sat on nests or perched for an average of 85% of the day. During the peak of summer in Utah, hunting and territorial flights occurred mostly between 9:00 and 11:00 am and 4:00 and 6:00 pm, with the remaining 15 or so hours of daylight spent perching or resting.

Golden Eagles visit water sources for drinking, bathing, and preening, particularly during summer months. When conditions are heavily anticyclonic, they are observed to soar less during the day. During winter in Scotland, golden eagles soar frequently in order to scan the environment for carrion. In the more wooded environments of Norway during autumn and winter, much less aerial activity is reported, since the eagles tend to avoid detection by actively contour-hunting rather than looking for carrion. Golden eagles are believed to sleep through much of the night. Although usually highly solitary outside of the bond between breeding pairs, exceptionally cold weather in winter may cause eagles to put their usual guard down and perch together. The largest known congregation of golden eagles was observed on an extremely cold winter's night in eastern Idaho when 124 individuals were observed perched closely along a line of 85 power poles.

=== Migration ===
Where most populations of golden eagles are sedentary, the species is a partial migrant. Golden eagles are hardy species, being well adapted to cold climates; however, they cannot abide declining available food sources in the northern stretches of their range. Eagles raised at latitudes greater than 60° N are usually migratory, though a short migration may be untaken by those who breed or hatch at about 50° N. During migration, they often use soaring-gliding flight, rather than powered flight. In Finland, most banded juveniles move between 1,000 and 2,000 km (620 and 1,240 mi) due south, whereas adults stay locally through winter. Further east, conditions are too harsh for even wintering territorial adults. Golden eagles that breed from the Kola peninsula to Anadyr in the Russian Far East migrate south to winter on the Russian and Mongolian steppes, and the North China Plains. The flat, relatively open landscapes in these regions hold relatively few resident breeding golden eagles. Similarly the entire population of golden eagles from northern and central Alaska and northern Canada migrates south. At Mount Lorette in Alberta, approximately 4,000 golden eagles may pass during the fall, the largest recorded migration of golden eagles on earth. Here the mountain ranges are relatively moderate and consistent, thus being reliable for thermals and updrafts which made long-distance migrating feasible.

Birds hatched in Denali National Park in Alaska traveled from 818 to 4,815 km (508 to 2,992 mi) to their winter ranges in western North America. These western migrants may winter anywhere from southern Alberta and Montana to New Mexico and Arizona and from inland California to Nebraska. Adults who bred in northeastern Hudson Bay area of Canada reached their wintering grounds, which range from central Michigan to southern Pennsylvania to northeastern Alabama, in 26 to 40 days, with arrival dates from November to early December. The departure dates from wintering grounds are variable. In southwestern Canada, they leave their wintering grounds by 6 April to 8 May (the mean being 21 April); in southwestern Idaho, wintering birds leave from 20 March to 13 April (mean of 29 March); and in the Southwestern United States, wintering birds may depart by early March. Elsewhere in the species' breeding range, golden eagles (i.e., those who breed in the contiguous Western United States, all of Europe but for Northern Scandinavia, North Africa and all of Asia but for Northern Russia) are non-migratory and tend to remain within striking distance of their breeding territories throughout the year. In Scotland, among all recovered, banded golden eagles (36 out of 1000, the rest mostly died or disappeared) the average distance between ringing and recovery was 44 km (27 mi), averaging 63 km (39 mi) in juveniles and 36 km (22 mi) in older birds. In the dry Southwestern United States, golden eagles tend to move to higher elevations once the breeding season is complete. In North Africa, populations breeding at lower latitudes, like Morocco, are mostly sedentary, although some occasionally disperse after breeding to areas outside of the normal breeding range.

=== Territoriality ===
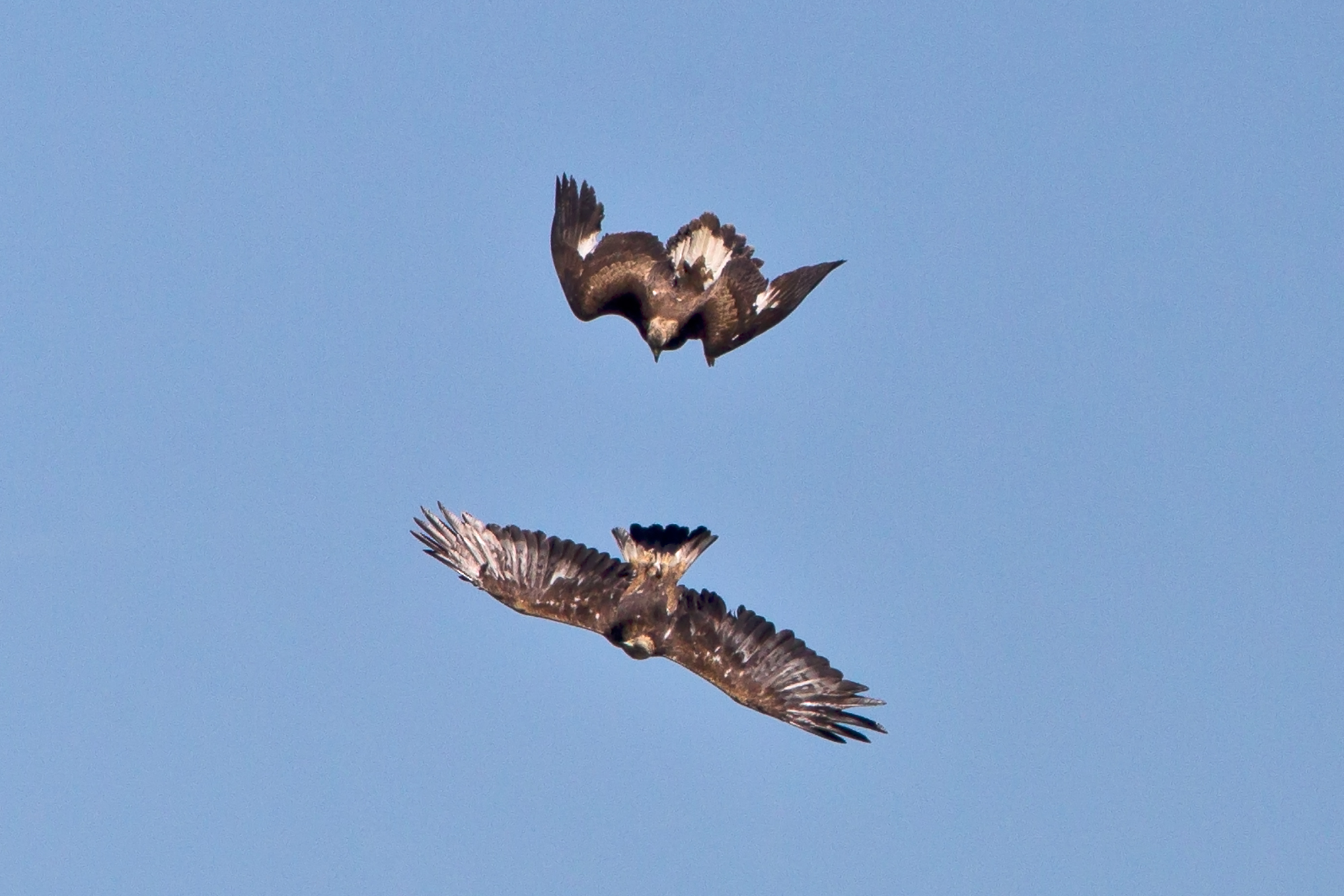
Two golden eagles in an aerial conflict over their home ranges, the upper bird clearly a juvenile

Territoriality is believed to be the primary cause of interactions and confrontations between non-paired golden eagles. Golden eagles maintain some of the largest known home ranges (or territories) of any bird species but there is much variation of home range size across the range, possibly dictated by food abundance and habitat preference. Home ranges in most of the range can vary from 20 to 200 km^{2} (7.7 to 77.2 sq mi). In San Diego County in California, the home ranges varied from 49 to 137 km^{2} (19 to 53 sq mi), with an average of 93 km^{2} (36 sq mi). However, some home ranges have been much smaller, such as in southwestern Idaho where, possibly due to an abundance of jackrabbits, home ranges as small as 4.85 km^{2} (1.87 sq mi) are maintained. The smallest known home ranges on record for golden eagles are in the Bale Mountains of Ethiopia, where they range from 1.5 to 9 km^{2} (0.58 to 3.47 sq mi). 46% of undulating displays in Montana occurred shortly after the juvenile eagles left their parents range, suggesting that some residents defend and maintain territories year-round. Elsewhere it is stated that home ranges are less strictly maintained during winter but hunting grounds are basically exclusive.

In Israel and Scotland, aggressive encounters peaked from winter until just before egg-laying and were less common during the nesting season. Threat displays include undulating flight and aggressive direct flapping flight with exaggerated downstrokes. Most displays by mature golden eagles (67% for males and 76% for females) occur, rather than around the nest, at the edge of their home ranges. In Western Norway, most recorded undulating flight displays occur during the pre-laying period in late winter/early spring. Display flights seem to be triggered by the presence of other golden eagles. The use of display flights has a clear benefit in that it lessens the need for physical confrontations, which can be fatal. Usually, non-breeding birds are treated aggressively by the golden eagle maintaining their home range, normally being chased to the apparent limit of the range but with no actual physical contact. The territorial flight of the adult golden eagle is sometimes preceded or followed by intense bouts of undulating displays. The invader often responds by rolling over and presenting talons to the aggressor. Rarely, the two eagles will lock talons and tumble through the air; sometimes fall several revolutions and in some cases even tumble to the ground before releasing their grip.

In some parts of the Alps, the golden eagle population has reached the saturation point in appropriate habitat and apparently violent confrontations are more common than in other parts of the range. Golden eagles may express their aggression via body language while perched, typically the adult female when confronted by an intruding eagle: the head and body are upright, feathers on head and neck are erect; the wings may be slightly spread and beak open; often accompanied by intense gaze. They then often engage in a similar posture with wings spread wide and oriented toward the threat; sometimes rocking back on tail and even flopping over onto the back with talons extended upward as defense. Such behavior may be accompanied by wing slap against the threatening intruder. When approached by an intruder, the defending eagle turns away, partially spreads tail, lowers head, and remains still; adults on the nest may lower head and "freeze" when approached by a person or a helicopter. Females in Israel displayed more than males and mostly against interspecific intruders; males apparently displayed primarily as part of courtship. Five of 7 aggressive encounters at carcasses during winter in Norway were won by females; in 15 of 21 conflicts, the younger bird dominated an older conspecific. However, obvious juvenile eagles (apparent to the adult eagles due to the amount of white on their wings and tail) are sometimes allowed to penetrate deeply into a pair's home range and all parties commonly ignore each other. In North Dakota, it was verified that parent eagles were not aggressive towards their own young after the nesting period and some juveniles stayed on their parents territory until their 2nd spring and then left by their own accord.

== Reproduction ==
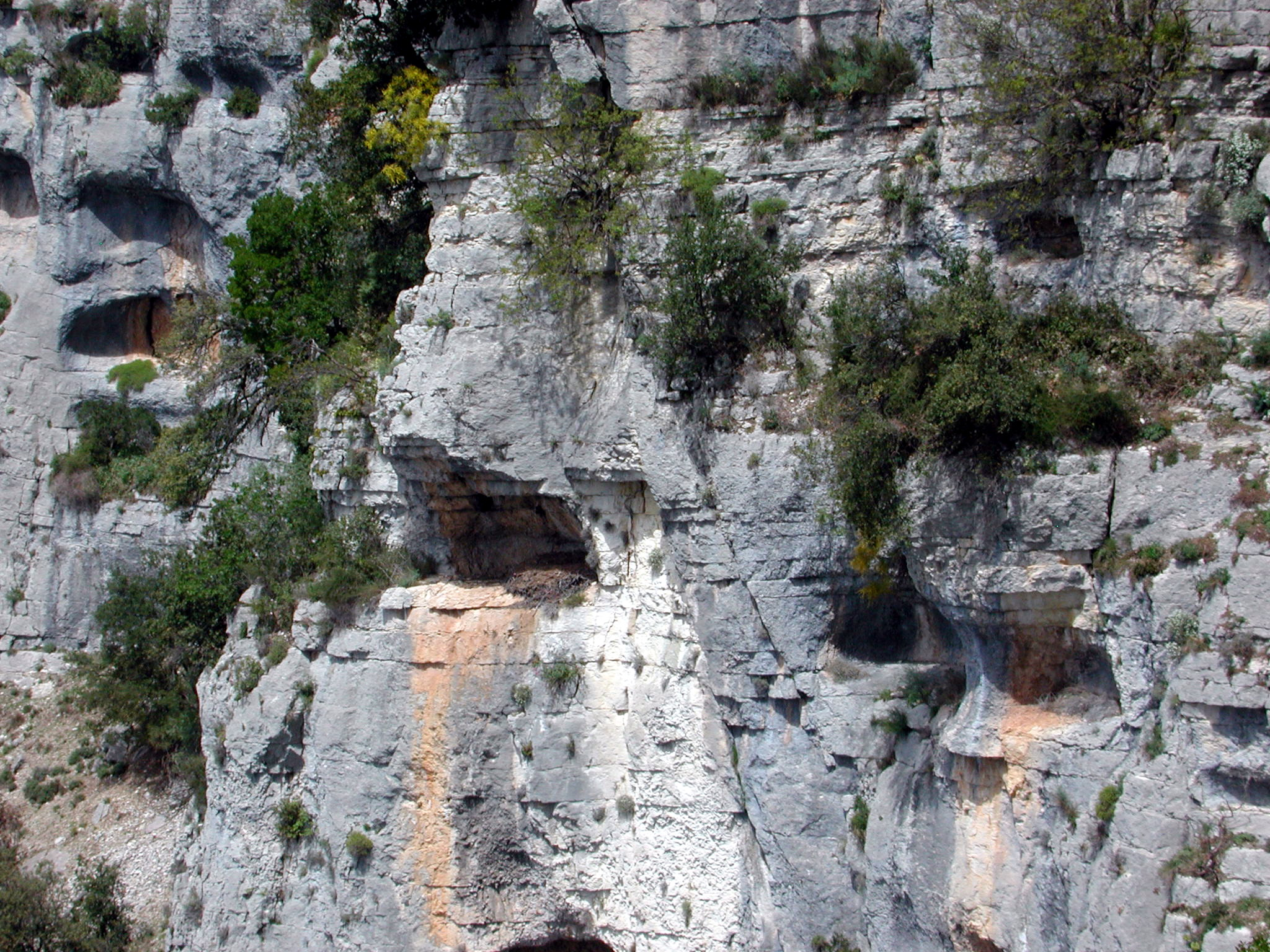
Eyrie (in hollow at left center) in the Valley of the Siagne de la Pare, Alpes-Maritimes, France

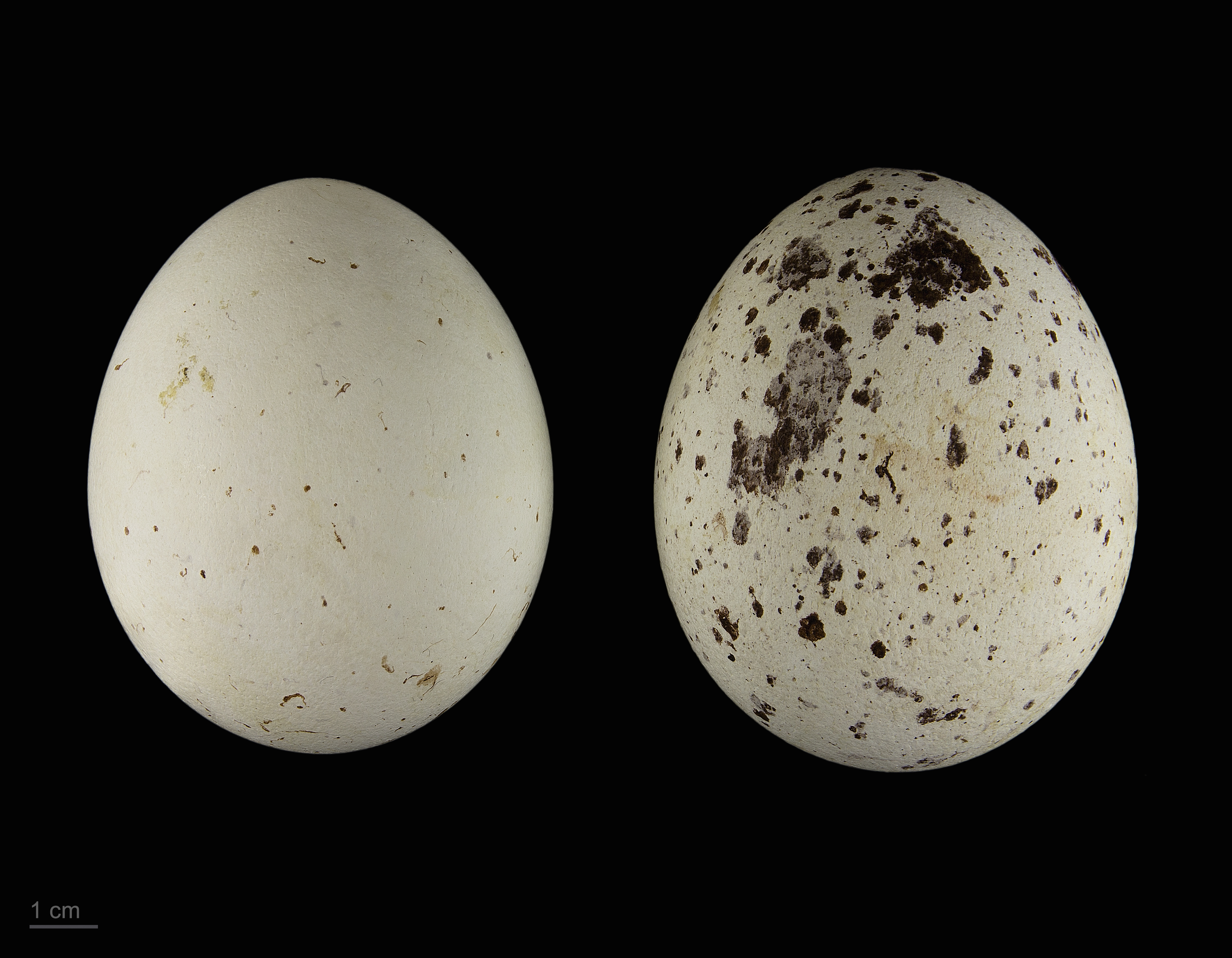
Aquila chrysaetos – MHNT

Golden eagles usually mate for life. A breeding pair is formed in a courtship display. This courtship includes undulating displays by both in the pair, with the male bird picking up a piece of rock or a small stick, and dropping it only to enter into a steep dive and catch it in mid-air, repeating the maneuver three or more times. The female takes a clump of earth and drops and catches it in the same fashion. Golden eagles typically build several eyries within their territory (preferring cliffs) and use them alternately for several years. Their nesting areas are characterized by the extreme regularity of the nest spacing. Mating and egg-laying timing for golden eagle is variable depending on the locality. Copulation normally lasts 10–20 seconds. Mating seems to occur around 40–46 days before the initial egg-laying. The golden eagle chick may be heard from within the egg 15 hours before it begins hatching. After the first chip is broken off of the egg, there is no activity for around 27 hours. Hatching activity accelerates and the shell is broken apart in 35 hours. The chick is completely free in 37 hours.

In the first 10 days, chicks mainly lie down on the nest substrate. They are capable of preening on their second day but their parents keep them warm until around 20 days. They grow considerably, weighing around 500 g (1.1 lb). They also start sitting up more. Around 20 days of age, the chicks generally start standing, which becomes the main position over the course of the next 40 days. The whitish down continues until around 25 days of age, at which point it is gradually replaced by dark contour feathers that eclipse the down and the birds attain a general piebald appearance. After hatching, 80% of food items and 90% of food biomass is captured and brought to the nest by the adult male. Fledging occurs at 66 to 75 days of age in Idaho and 70 to 81 days in Scotland. The first attempted flight departure after fledging can be abrupt, with the young jumping off and using a series of short, stiff wing-beats to glide downward or being blown out of nest while wing-flapping. 18 to 20 days after first fledging, the young eagles will take their first circling flight, but they cannot gain height as efficiently as their parents until approximately 60 days after fledging. In Cumbria, young golden eagles were first seen hunting large prey 59 days after fledging. 75 to 85 days after fledging, the young were largely independent of parents. Generally, breeding success seems to be greatest where prey is available in abundance.

== Longevity ==
Golden eagles are fairly long-living birds in natural conditions if they survive their first few years. The survival rate of raptorial birds tends to increase with larger body size, with a 30–50% annual loss of population rate in small falcons/accipiters, a 15–25% loss of population rate in medium-sized hawks (e.g., Buteos or kites) and a 5% or less rate of loss in eagles and vultures. The oldest known wild golden eagle was a bird banded in Sweden which was recovered 32 years later. The longest-lived known wild golden eagle in North America was 31 years and 8 months. The longest-lived known captive golden eagle, a specimen in Europe, survived to 46 years of age. The estimated adult annual survival rate on the Isle of Skye in Scotland is around 97.5%. When this extrapolated into an estimated lifespan this results in 39 1/2 years as the average for adult golden eagles in this area, which is probably far too high an estimate.

Survival rates are usually much lower in juvenile eagles than in adult eagles. In the western Rocky Mountains, 50% of golden eagles banded in the nest died by the time they were 2 1/2 years and an estimated 75% died by the time they were 5 years old. Near a wind turbine facility in west-central California, estimated survival rates, based on conventional telemetry of 257 individuals, were 84% for first-year eagles, 79% for 1- to 3-year-olds and adult floaters and 91% for breeders; with no difference in survival rates between sexes. Survival rates may be lower for migrating populations of golden eagles. A 19–34% survival rate was estimated for juvenile eagles from Denali National Park in their first 11 months. The average life expectancy of golden eagles in Germany is 13 years, extrapolated from a reported mere 92.5% survival rate.

=== Natural mortality ===
Natural sources of mortality are largely reported in anecdotes. On rare occasions, golden eagles have been killed by competing predators or by hunting mammalian carnivores, including the aforementioned wolverine, snow leopard, cougar, brown bear and white-tailed eagle attacks. Most competitive attacks resulting in death probably occur at the talons of other golden eagles. Nestlings and fledglings are more likely to be killed by another predator than free-flying juveniles and adults. It has been suspected that golden eagle nests may be predated more frequently by other predators (especially birds, which are often the only other large animals that can access a golden eagle nest without the assistance of man-made climbing equipment) in areas where golden eagles are regularly disturbed at the nest by humans. Jeff Watson believed that common raven occasionally eats golden eagle eggs but only in situations where the parent eagles have abandoned their nesting attempt. However, there are no confirmed accounts of predation by other bird species on golden eagle nests.

Occasionally, golden eagles may be killed by their prey in self-defense. There is an account of a golden eagle dying from the quills of a North American porcupine (Erethizon dorsatum) it had attempted to hunt. On the Isle of Rùm in Scotland, there are a few cases of red deer trampling golden eagles to death, probably the result of a doe having intercepted a bird that was trying to kill a fawn. Although usually well out-matched by the predator, occasionally other large birds can put up a formidable fight against a golden eagle. An attempted capture of a great blue heron by a golden eagle resulted in the death of both birds from wounds sustained in the ensuing fight. There is at least one case in Scotland of a golden eagle dying after being "oiled" by a northern fulmar, a bird whose primary defense against predators is to disgorge an oily secretion which may inhibit the predator's ability to fly.

Of natural sources of death, starvation is probably under-reported. 11 of 16 dead juvenile eagles which had hatched in Denali National Park had died of starvation. Of 36 deaths of golden eagles in Idaho, 55% were possibly attributable to natural causes, specifically 8 (26%) from unknown trauma, 3 (10%) from disease and 6 (19%) from unknown causes. Of 266 golden eagle deaths in Spain, only 6% were from unknown causes that could not be directly attributed to human activities. Avian cholera caused by bacteria (Pasteurella multocida) infects eagles that eat waterfowl that have died from the disease. The protozoan Trichomonas sp. caused the deaths of four fledglings in a study of wild golden eagles in Idaho. Several further diseases that contribute to golden eagle deaths have been examined in Japan. A captive eagle died from two malignant tumors – one in the liver and one in the kidney.

== Killing permits ==
In December 2016, the US Fish and Wildlife Service proposed allowing wind-turbine electric generation companies to kill golden eagles without penalty, so long as "companies take steps to minimize the losses". If issued, the permits would last 30 years, six times the current 5-year permits.

== In human culture ==
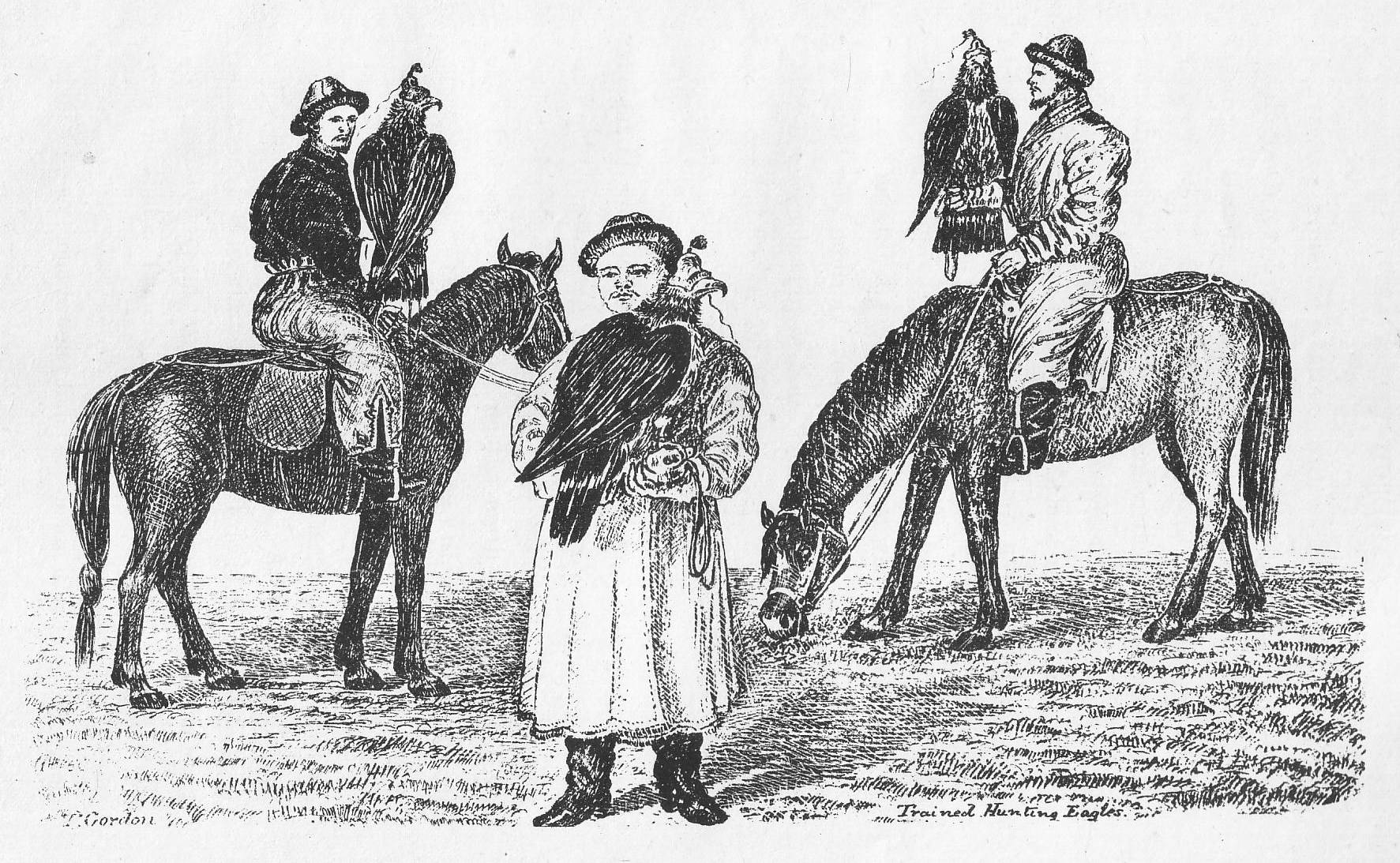
1870s illustration of burkut falconers in Kazakhstan

Human beings have been fascinated by the golden eagle as early as the beginning of recorded history. Most early-recorded cultures regarded the golden eagle with reverence. In pre-Hispanic Mesoamerica, the eagle was a major Mexica (Aztec) symbol: the tribal and sun god, Huitzilopochtli, had told his people that when they saw the sun (i.e., Huitzilopochtli) in the form of an eagle perched on a cactus whose fruit was red and shaped like a human heart, there they should build their city, Tenochtitlan. The scene—shown on a well-known sculpture, in early manuscripts, and on the present-day Mexican flag—surely had astronomical and geomantic, as well as mythological meaning.

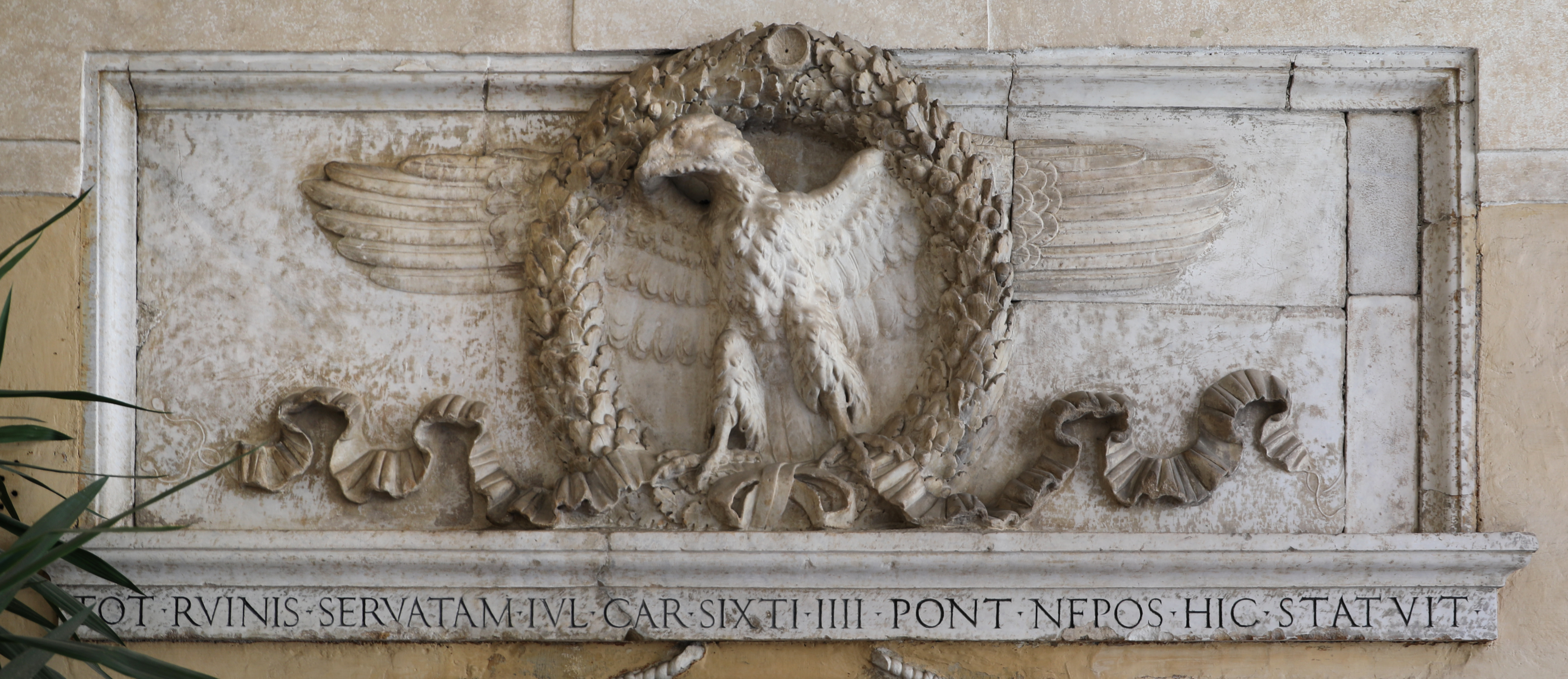
Because of its connection with Jupiter, the golden eagle was widely used as a symbol of imperial might in the Roman Empire

The golden eagle was also a prominent symbol of the Roman Empire and was used frequently in the Roman army. The bird was featured on its unofficial banner and was a common emblem in legions. A legionary known as an aquilifer, the "eagle-bearer", carried this standard. Each legion carried one eagle. The location of the eagles on the battlefield indicated troop movements during a military engagement. The eagle was considered of religious importance to the Roman soldier, and to lose a standard was considered shameful and dishonorable. Roman legions made great efforts to protect the standard in battle, and to recover one if it became lost or stolen.

It was only after the Industrial Revolution, when sport-hunting became widespread and commercial stock farming became internationally common, that humans started to widely regard golden eagles as a threat to their livelihoods. This period also brought about the firearm and industrialized poisons, which made it easy for humans to kill the evasive and powerful birds.

In 2017 the French Army trained golden eagles to catch drones. The golden eagle is officially Utah's state bird of prey.

== Status and conservation ==
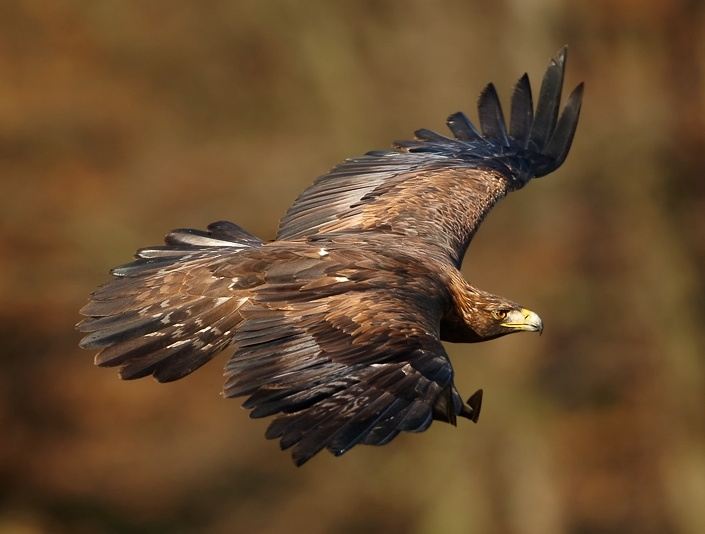
In flight in Czech Republic

At one time, the golden eagle lived in a great majority of temperate Europe, North Asia, North America, North Africa, and Japan. Although widespread and quite secure in some areas, in many parts of the range golden eagles have experienced sharp population declines and have even been extirpated from some areas. The number of golden eagles from around the range is estimated to be between 170,000 and 250,000 while the estimates of breeding pairs are from 60,000 to 100,000. It has the largest known range of any member of its family, with a range estimated at 140 million square kilometers. If its taxonomic order is considered, it is the second most wide-ranging species after only the osprey (Pandion haliaetus). Few other eagle species are as numerous, though some species like the tawny eagle, wedge-tailed eagle and bald eagle have total estimated populations of a similar size to the golden eagle's despite their more restricted distributions. The world's most populous eagle may be the African fish eagle (Haliaeetus vocifer), which has a stable total population estimated at 300,000 and is found solely in Africa. On a global scale, the golden eagle is not considered threatened by the IUCN.

A recent report said that according to a forestry study in England, the Golden Eagle can return for the first time in 150 years. This was achieved by a government conservation initiative, marking eight areas highly potential for reintroducing the eagles. This is backed by a £1 million in funding for the project.
