= Yalchuk =

Moon goddess in Turkic mythology

Yalchuk is the moon goddess in Turkic mythology.

In ancient Turkic folk religion and myth, Yalçuk is the divine embodiment of the Moon. She is often presented as the female complement of the Sun (Koyash) conceived of as a god. Koyash and Yalchuk are categorized as among the visible gods. Yalchuk is said to have lived on a mountain top in a house with seven stories, from which she controlled the fate of the world.

Yalchuk is often depicted driving a two-yoke chariot, drawn by horses or oxen. Like her companion Koyash, the Sun, who drives his chariot across the sky each day, Yalchuk is also said to drive across the heavens. She has power horns on head.

She is commonly depicted with a crescent moon, often accompanied by stars; sometimes, instead of a crescent, a lunar disc is used. Often a crescent moon rests on her brow, or the cusps of a crescent moon protrude, horn-like, from her head, or from behind her head or shoulders.

The word Yalçuk means bright or shining. Another meaning of the word is envoy or delegate

== See also ==
- Koyash
