= Burkut =

Burkut (Bürküt or Merküt) is the eagle god in Turkic mythology.

The eagle god Burkut symbolizes the sun and power. The eagle is considered to be the icon of the khagans and khans or the symbol of the guardian spirit and justice. In Sakha (Yakut) culture, the eagle is portrayed on top of the Ulukayın (Tree of Earth). It is either the symbol of Tengri (sky god). In the ceremony of sacrifice, a kam (shaman) chants verses of prayer and summons all the spirits he knows. The eagle is referred to as the "bird with copper talons, its right wing covers the sun, the left covers the moon" and son of Kayra.

== In Anatolia ==
Among a kind of Turkish folk dance named Halay is the Anatolian "Kartal Halayı" (eagles dance), "Karakuş" (the black bird) and "Karakustana" figures with bravery as the main theme are the figures known as the eagle position.
