= Ecem =

Ecem is a Turkish word meaning "my queen" and may refer to:

- Ecem Alıcı (born 1994), Turkish volleyball player
- Ecem Cumert (born 1998), Turkish-German footballer
- Ecem Dönmez (born 1998), Turkish swimmer
- Ecem Güler (born 1992), Turkish basketball player
- Ecem Güzel (born 1995), Turkish sport sailor
- Ecem Taşın (born 1991), Turkish Paralympic judoka
- Emine Ecem Esen (born 1994), Turkish footballer

== See also ==
- Ece
