= Tengri =

Chief deity of the Eurasian steppe religion

- God of Heaven
- Spelling of 𐱅𐰭𐰼𐰃 tengri in the Old Turkic script (written from right to left, as t²ṅr²i)
- Abode: Sky
- Gender: Male
- Ethnic group: Turkic peoples

Genealogy
- Spouse: Umay

Tengri (Note: Old Turkic: 𐰚𐰇𐰚:𐱅𐰭𐰼𐰃, romanized: Kök Teŋri/Teŋiri, lit. 'Blue Heaven'; Old Uyghur: tängri; Middle Turkic: تآنغرِ; Ottoman Turkish: تڭری; Kyrgyz: Теңир; Kazakh: Тәңір; Turkish: Tanrı; Azerbaijani: Tanrı; Bulgarian: Тангра; Proto-Turkic: *teŋri / *taŋrɨ; Mongolian script: ᠲᠩᠷᠢ, T'ngri; Mongolian: Тэнгэр, Tenger; Uyghur: تەڭرى, tengri) is the all-encompassing God of Heaven in the traditional Turkic, Yeniseian, Mongolic, and various other nomadic religious beliefs. Some qualities associated with Tengri as the judge and source of life, and being eternal and supreme, led European and Muslim writers to identify Tengri as a deity of Turkic and Mongolic peoples. According to Mongolian belief, Tengri's will (jayayan) may break its own usual laws and intervene by sending a chosen person to earth.

It is also one of the terms used for the primary chief deity of the early Turkic and Mongolic peoples.

Worship surrounding Tengri is called Tengrism. The core beings in Tengrism are the Sky Father (Tenger Etseg) and the Earth Mother (Umay Ana). It involves ancestor worship, as Tengri was thought to have been the ancestral progenitor of mankind in Turkic regions and Mongolia, shamanism, animism, and totemism.

== Name ==
The oldest form of the name is recorded in Chinese annals from the 4th century BC, describing the beliefs of the Xiongnu. It takes the form 撑犁/Cheng-li, which is hypothesized to be a Chinese transcription of Tängri. (The Proto-Turkic form of the word has been reconstructed as *Teŋri or, the back-ablauted variant *Taŋrï.) It is generally assumed the term tengri originally meant "sky". Andrey Kononov suggested that the term is formed by the words tän (morning) and injir (evening) into tänri, referring to the sky as whole.

The Turkic form, Tengri, is attested in the 8th century Orkhon inscriptions as the Old Turkic form 𐱅𐰭𐰼𐰃 Teŋri. In modern Turkish, the derived word "Tanrı" is used as the generic word for "god", or for the Abrahamic God, and is used today by Turkish people to refer to any god. The supreme deity of the traditional religion of the Chuvash is Tură.

Other reflexes of the name in modern languages include Mongolian: Тэнгэр ("sky"), Bulgarian: Тангра, Azerbaijani: Tanrı.

Earlier, the Chinese word for "sky" 天 (Mandarin: tiān < Old Chinese *thīn or *thîn) had been suggested to be related to Tengri, possibly a loan into Chinese from a prehistoric Central Asian language. However, this proposal is unlikely in light of recent reconstructions of the Old Chinese pronunciation of the character "天", such as */qʰl'iːn/ (Zhengzhang) or */l̥ˤi[n]/ (Baxter-Sagart), which propose for 天 a voiceless lateral onset, either a cluster or single consonant, respectively. Baxter & Sagart (2014:113-114) pointed to attested dialectal differences in Eastern Han Chinese, the use of 天 as a phonetic component in phono-semantic compound Chinese characters, and the choice of 天 to transcribe foreign syllables, all of which prompted them to conclude that, around 200 CE, 天's onset had two pronunciations: coronal */tʰ/ and dorsal */x/, both of which likely originated from an earlier voiceless lateral */l̥ˤ/.

Linguist Stefan Georg has proposed that the Turkic word ultimately originates as a loanword from Proto-Yeniseian *tɨŋgVr- "high".

Amy Chua renders the name as "[T]he Eternal Blue Sky", likely because of the connotations of the name's usage.

== History ==
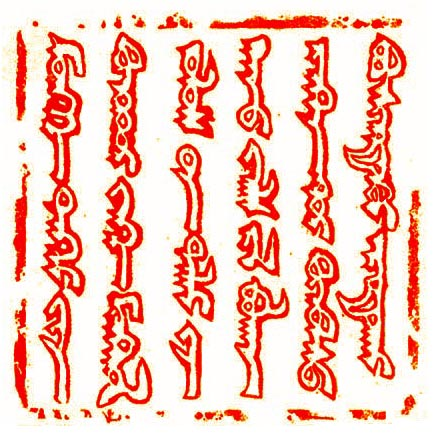
Seal from Güyüg Khan's letter to Pope Innocent IV, 1246. The first four words, from top to bottom, left to right, read "möngke ṭngri-yin küčündür" – "Under the power of the eternal heaven".

Tengri was the national god of the Göktürks, described as the "god of the Turks" (Türük Tängrisi). The Göktürk khans based their power on a mandate from Tengri. These rulers were generally accepted as the sons of Tengri who represented him on Earth. They wore titles such as tengrikut, kutluġ or kutalmysh, based on the belief that they attained kut, some sort of heavenly and spiritual force granted to these rulers by Tengri.

Prior to foreign influences, the Turkic conception of tengri was regarded as the heaven or the will controlling heaven, probably some sort of force. Out of this, the concept of a personal being developed. First, when Turkic people took over other religions, the term tengri became the name of a (personal) god or "higher being".

Tengri was the chief deity worshipped by the ruling class of the Central Asian steppe peoples in 6th to 9th centuries (Turkic peoples, Mongols and Hungarians). It lost its importance when the Uighur khagans proclaimed Manichaeism the state religion in the 8th century. The worship of Tengri was brought into Eastern Europe by the Huns and early Bulgars.

Tengri is considered to be the chief god who created all things. In addition to this celestial god, they also had minor divinities (Alps) that served the purposes of Tengri. As Gök Tanrı, he was the father of the sun (Koyash) and moon (Ay Tanrı) and also Umay, Erlik, and sometimes Ülgen.

== Mythology ==
Tengri was the main god of the Turkic pantheon, controlling the celestial sphere. Tengri is considered to be similar to the Indo-European sky god, *Dyeus, and the structure of the reconstructed Proto-Indo-European religion is closer to that of the early Turks than to the religion of any people of Near Eastern or Mediterranean antiquity. In Christian Turkish usage Tengri is used for the father of Jesus, who is referred to as "Tengri Oghli" (Son of God) and "Mshikha Tengri" (Messiah God). Tengri is also compared to Allah and Khuda. Apart from foreign religious influences, as far as known today, the original Turkish concept of Tengri was that of "heaven" or a spirit ruling in heaven. This spirit was probably imagined as some sort of force, corresponding to "mana" in modern ethnology.

The most important contemporary testimony of Tengri worship is found in the Old Turkic Orkhon inscriptions, dated to the early 8th century. Written in the so-called Orkhon script, these inscriptions record an account of the mythological origins of the Turks. The inscription dedicated to Kul Tigin includes the passages (in the translation provided by the Language Committee of Ministry of Culture and Information of the Republic of Kazakhstan): "When the blue sky [Tengri] above and the brown earth below were created, between them a human being was created. Over the human beings, my ancestors Bumin Kagan and Istemi Kagan ruled. They ruled people by Turkish laws, they led them and succeeded" (face 1, line 1); "Tengri creates death. Human beings have all been created in order to die" (Old Turkic: Öd Teŋri yasar kisi oγlu qop ölgeli törürmis), (face 2, line 9); "You passed away (lit.: 'went flying') until Tengri gives you life again" (face 2, line 14). Khagans ruled by the will of Tengri thought the ancient Turkic people and preserved these thoughts in the texts of the Orkhon inscriptions in the following way: "I, Tengri-like and Tengri-born Turk Bilge Kaghan, succeeded to the throne at this time" (Old Turkic: Teŋiriteg Teŋiride bolmuš Türük Bilge Qaγan bü ödüke olurtum).

In one Turkic myth, Tengri is a pure, white goose that flies constantly over an endless expanse of water, which represents time. Beneath this water, Ak Ana ("White Mother") calls out to him saying "Create". To overcome his loneliness, Tengri creates Er Kishi, who is not as pure or as white as Tengri and together they set up the world. Er Kishi becomes a demonic character and strives to mislead people and draw them into its darkness. Tengri assumes the name Tengri Ülgen and withdraws into Heaven from which he tries to provide people with guidance through sacred animals that he sends among them. The Ak Tengris occupy the fifth level of Heaven. Shaman priests who want to reach Tengri Ülgen never get further than this level, where they convey their wishes to the divine guides. Returns to earth or to the human level take place in a goose-shaped vessel.

== Geographical names ==
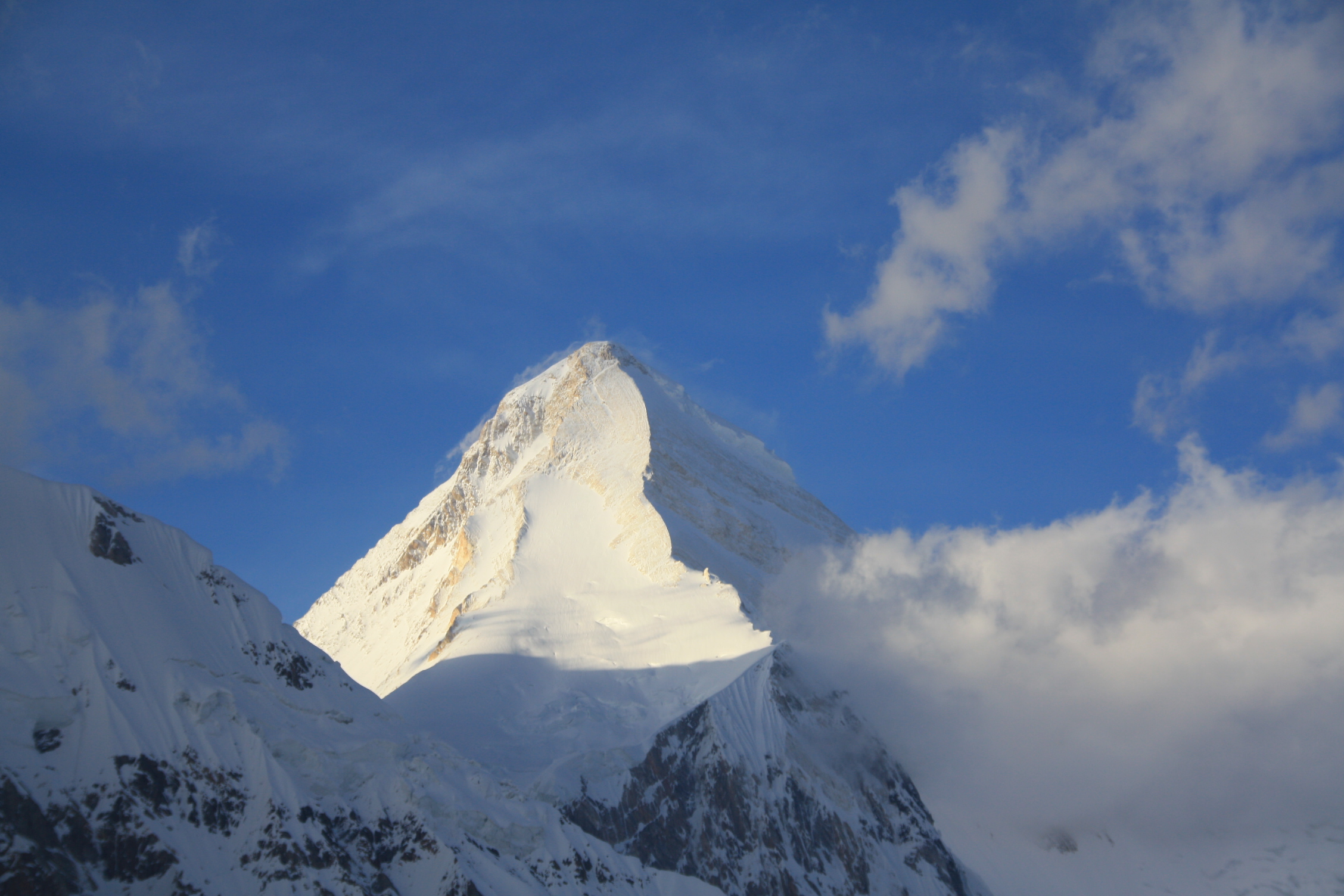
The Khan Tengri pyramidal peak

- A pyramidal peak of the Tian Shan range between China, Kazakhstan, and Kyrgyzstan, is called "Khan Tengri." The Tian Shan itself is known in Uyghur as the Tanri Tagi.
- The Tangra Mountains on Livingston Island in the South Shetland Islands of Antarctica are also named after the deity.
- Otgontenger, the highest mountain of the Khangai mountains in Mongolia.
- Tengger Desert, a desert in Inner Mongolia, China.

== See also ==
- Tengger Cavalry, a Mongolian folk metal band in China named after Tengri.
- Tengri Khan, a title addressed to the Emperor Taizong of Tang.
