= Aquila chrysaetos simurgh =

Aquila chrysaetos simurgh Temporal range: Late Pleistocene

Scientific classification
- Kingdom: Animalia
- Phylum: Chordata
- Class: Aves
- Order: Accipitriformes
- Family: Accipitridae
- Genus: Aquila
- Species: A. chrysaetos
- Subspecies: †A. c. simurgh

Trinomial name
- †Aquila chrysaetos simurgh Weesie, 1988

Synonyms
- Aquila simurgh

Extinct subspecies of bird

Aquila chrysaetos simurgh is an extinct subspecies of the widespread golden eagle. Its fossils are found in Crete; it was sometimes evaluated as a full species.

== Ecology ==
It lived during the Pleistocene in Crete with Mammuthus creticus, the smallest known mammoth species.
