= Koyash =

Sun god in Turkic Mythology

- Sun
- Abode: Sky
- Symbol: Wind Horse and Fiery Bird

Genealogy
- Parents: Kayra and Yer Tengri
- Siblings: Umay; Ülgen; Erlik; Ay Ata

Koyash (Orkhon: 𐰸𐰆𐰖𐰽𐰴) is the god of sun in Turkic mythology.

Kök Tengri created the earth with rays of sun light, thus, Koyash took part in the creation of Earth. Solar rays are also considered to be "strings" between the Sun and the spirits of plants, animals and humans.

Turks who worship Koyash turn towards the sunrise when praying. Koyash is the son of Kayra and the Earth Goddess. The power and vital force of the Sun God, making it a priority to bow to him each morning as he rises. Solar rays are strings that link the spirits of plants to heaven, and considered a medium for transmitting Tengri into infants. Koyash is often depicted as a fiery bird or a winged horse. These images are often used to adorn things such as ceramic pots and earrings in ancient times.

The sun god Koyash can make "solar strands" from his hands capable of ensnaring and burning his victims. To the Altai people, the Sun represented light, warmth, and growth. This made the sun deity very important, as the Sun was seen as the ruler of all that he created. Then he is portrayed as a warrior.

== Sun in Turkic culture ==
The Sun (also Koyash) was the son of Kök-Tengri (Sky God) and the Toprak Ana (Earth Goddess). Nomadic people honoured the power and vital force of the Sun God. Reportedly the Huns, leaving their villages in the morning, welcomed the rising sun and bowed towards him. Altai people would turn towards the sunrise when praying. They worshipped the Sun because Kök-Tengri supervised the creation of the world by the Sun’s rays, which are but strings linking the spirits of plants to the Sun. Likewise solar rays were considered a medium for transmitting the life force sent by Tengri to the infant.

A vivid example is the legend of the birth of An Lushan by a Shamaness. At his conception it was said that a ray of light penetrated the yurt. Alan-Goa, the mother goddess, conceived from a ray that penetrated the yurt through a smoke hole. The Turkic people associated the Sun’s path in the sky with the flight of a fire-bird or a winged horse. Flying (winged) horses as symbols of the Sun were widely used in the cosmological myths of Turkic peoples. And other animals (rams, deer, bulls) were also connected with the Sun.

== See also ==
- List of solar deities

== See also ==
- Yalchuk
