= Ece Soydam =

Turkish documentary filmmaker (born 1971)

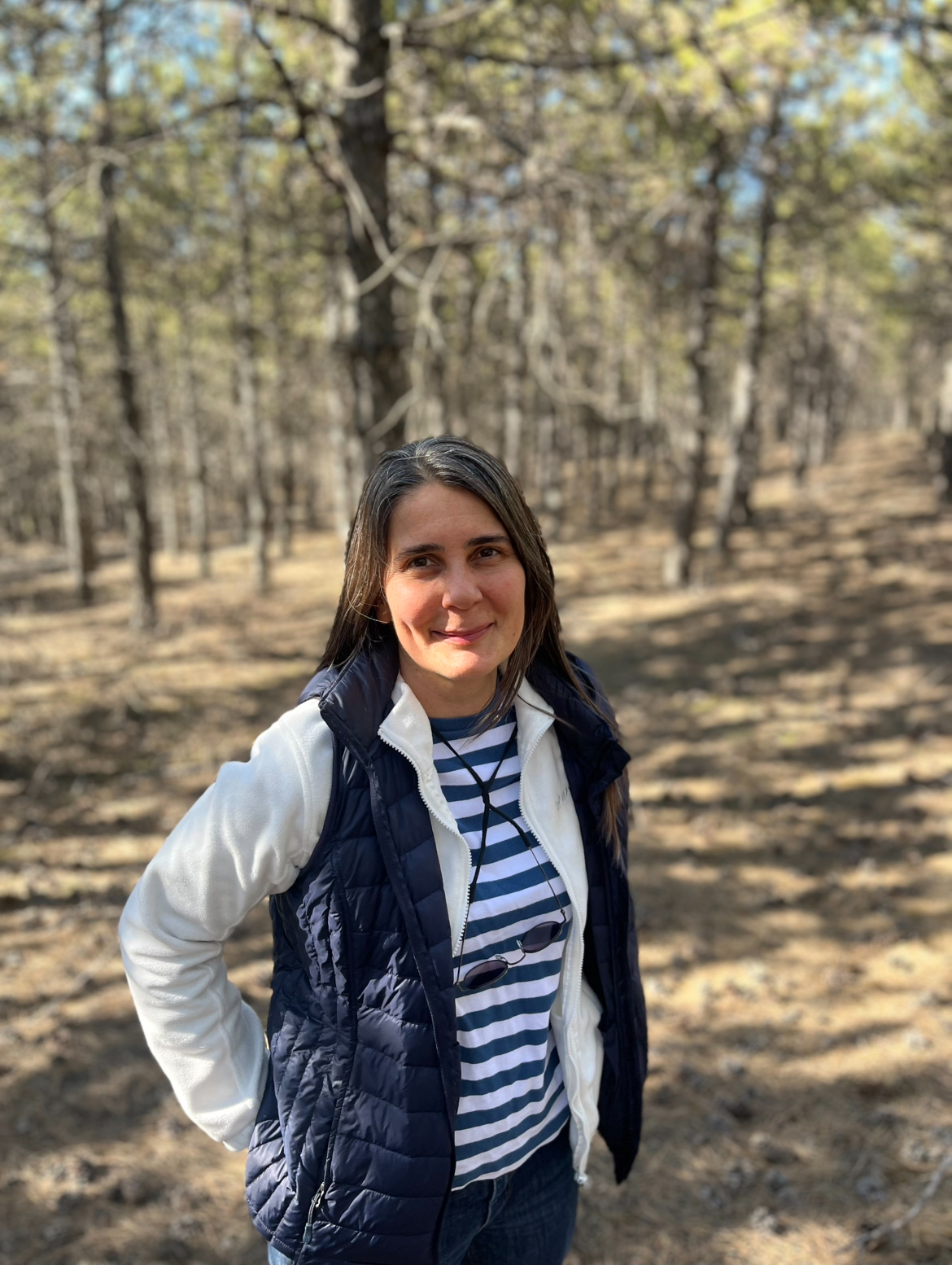
Ece Soydam, Turkish filmmaker

Ece Soydam (born 1971) is a Turkish documentary filmmaker whose work focuses on Anatolian wildlife and Native American cultures. Her documentaries have earned national and international recognition. Notably, Dev Kanatlar and Ormanın Sırrı: Karakulak were officially selected at the Green Screen Festival in Germany and the Innsbruck Nature Film Festival in Austria. She is also the founder and president of the Ankara International Wildlife Documentary Film Festival.

== Early life and education ==
Ece Soydam was born in 1971, in Ankara, Turkey. She graduated in 1992 from the Middle East Technical University (ODTÜ) in Ankara, where she studied English language teaching. She later completed graduate studies in social cultural anthropology department at the University of Toronto (1996–1998), and in 2002 received a certificate in ethnographic filmmaking from the Anthropology Film Center in Santa Fe, New Mexico.

== Career ==
She began her career in 1992 at Turkish Radio and Television Corporation (TRT)'s department of documentary programs. From 1993 to 1995, she worked as a production assistant for CNN World Report and joined the CNN Professionals Program in Atlanta. In the 1990s, she translated two books into Turkish: Touch the Earth by T. C. McLuhan (Turkish title: Yeryüzüne Dokun, 1994), and Indians of the United States by Clark Wissler (Turkish title: Kızılderililerin Tarihi, 1996).

Soydam founded the Ankara International Wildlife Documentary Film Festival to promote interest in Turkey's biodiversity and to foster the development of local wildlife filmmakers. The festival includes competitions for short and feature-length documentaries.

== Documentaries ==
Soydam's documentaries often follow a single species or community across all seasons. She frequently collaborates with cinematographer Erol Yazıcı and uses traditional musical elements in her films.

- Bozkırın Çocukları: Anadolu Yaban Koyunu (2004), focused on the Anatolian wild sheep; won the “Nature and Environment Friendly Award” in 2006
- Dev Kanatlar: Kara Akbaba (2006), highlighting the endangered black vulture; internationally recognized
- Kurt (2016), a year-long shoot capturing the behavior of Anatolian wolves in winter conditions
- Oturan Boğa'nın İzinde (2011), filmed in South Dakota, the film explores Sioux heritage and traditions. It was nominated for Best Documentary Feature at the 36th Annual American Indian Film Festival
- Ormanın Sırrı: Karakulak (2023), focused on the elusive caracal in Turkey's southwest region; finalist at Green Screen and Innsbruck
