= Tengrism =

Religion of the Eurasian steppe nations

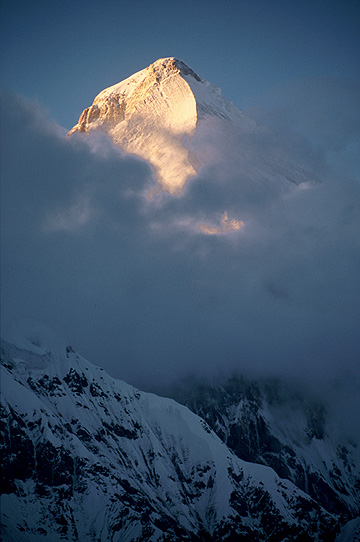
Peak of Khan Tengri at sunset

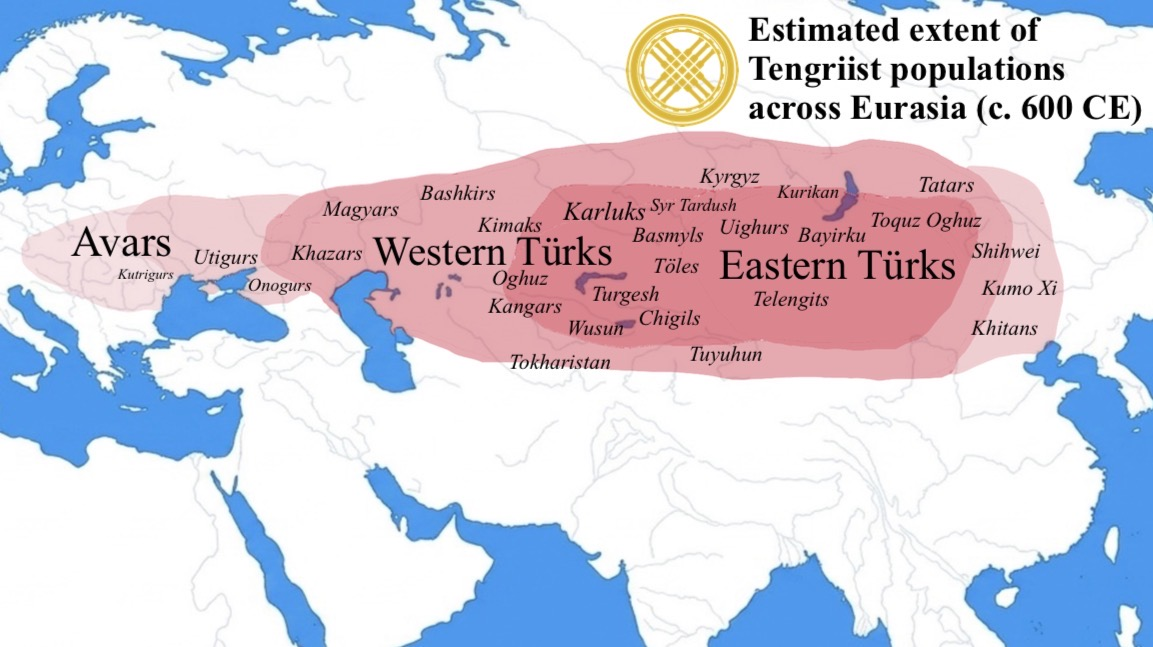
Estimated extent of Tengriist populations across Eurasia (c. 600 CE)

Tengrism (also known as Tengriism, Tengerism, or Tengrianism) is a belief system originating in the Eurasian steppes, based on shamanism and animism, and commonly centered on the titular sky god Tengri. According to some scholars, adherents of Tengrism view the purpose of life as living in harmony with the universe.

It was the prevailing religion of the Göktürk, Hun, Xianbei, Bulgar, Xiongnu, Yeniseian, and Mongolic peoples, as well as the state religion of several medieval states such as the First Turkic Khaganate, the Western Turkic Khaganate, the Eastern Turkic Khaganate, Old Great Bulgaria, the First Bulgarian Empire, Volga Bulgaria, Khazaria, and the Mongol Empire. In the Irk Bitig, a ninth-century manuscript on divination, Tengri is mentioned as Türük Tängrisi (God of Turks). According to many academics, Tengrism was, and to some extent still is, a predominantly polytheistic religion based on the shamanistic concept of animism, and it was first influenced by monotheism during the imperial period, especially by the 12th–13th centuries. Abdulkadir Inan has argued that Yakut and Altai shamanism are not entirely identical to the ancient Turkic religion.

According to Turkish historian Ahmet Taşağıl, Turkic Tengrism differed from classical shamanism, possessing a distinct theological structure. He argues that what is commonly termed "shamanism" constitutes a "Buddhism-mixed steppe tradition" and "a system of magic" rather than a formal religion. Based on historical evidence, he proposes that the ancient Turks were not shamanists, and they adhered to a unique Tengrist belief system centered around an abstract deity in heaven, distinguishing it from other forms.

The term also describes several contemporary Turkic and Mongolic native religious movements and teachings. All modern adherents of "political" Tengrism are monotheists. Tengrism has been advocated for in intellectual circles of the Turkic nations of Central Asia (Kyrgyzstan, Kazakhstan) and Russia (Tatarstan, Bashkortostan) since the dissolution of the Soviet Union, during the 1990s. Still practiced, it is undergoing an organized revival in Buryatia, Sakha, Khakassia, Tuva, and other Turkic nations in Siberia. Altaian Burkhanism and Chuvash Vattisen Yaly are contemporary movements similar to Tengrism.

The term tengri can refer to the sky deity Tenger Etseg—also Gök Tengri, Sky Father, Blue Sky—or to other deities. While Tengrism includes the worship of personified gods (tngri) such as Ülgen and Kayra, Tengri per se is considered an "abstract phenomenon". In Mongolian folk religion, Genghis Khan is considered one of the embodiments, if not the main embodiment, of Tengri's will.

== Terminology and relationship with shamanism ==
The forms of the name Tengri (Old Turkic: Täŋri) among the ancient and modern Turkic and Mongolic languages are Tengeri, Tangara, Tangri, Tanri, Tangre, Tegri, Tingir, Tenkri, Tangra, Teri, Ter, and Ture. The name Tengri ("the sky") is derived from Old Turkic: Tenk ("daybreak") or Tan ("dawn"). Meanwhile, Stefan Georg has proposed that the Turkic Tengri ultimately originates as a loanword from Proto-Yeniseian *tɨŋgɨr- – "high". Mongolia is sometimes poetically called the "Land of Eternal Blue Sky" (Mönkh Khökh Tengeriin Oron) by its inhabitants. According to some scholars, the name of the important deity Dangun (also Tangol) ("god of the mountains") of Korean folk religion is related to the Siberian Tengri ("heaven"), while the bear is a symbol of the Big Dipper (Ursa Major).

The word "Tengrism" is a fairly new term. The current spelling is found in the works of the 19th-century Kazakh ethnographer Shoqan Walikhanov. The term was introduced into scientific circulation in 1956 by French scholar Jean-Paul Roux and later in the 1960s as a general term in English-language papers.

Tengrianism is a reflection of the Russian term Тенгрианство ("Tengriánstvo"). It was introduced by Kazakh poet and turkologist Olzhas Suleymenov in his 1975 book AZ-and-IA. Since the 1990s, Russian-language literature uses it in the general sense, as for instance, reported in 1996 ("so-called Tengrianism") in the context of the nationalist rivalry over Bulgar legacy.

The spellings Tengriism, Tangrism, and Tengrianity can also be found since the 1990s. In modern Turkey and, partly in Kyrgyzstan, Tengrism is known as Tengricilik or Göktanrı dini ("sky god religion"); the Turkish gök ("sky") and tanrı ("god") correspond to the Mongolian khukh ("blue") and Tengeri ("sky"), respectively. The Mongolian Тэнгэр шүтлэг is used in a 1999 biography of Genghis Khan.

In the 20th century, a number of scientists proposed the existence of a religious imperial khagan cult in the ancient Turkic and Mongolian states. The Turkish historian of religion Ziya Gökalp (1876–1924) wrote in his History of Turkish Holy Tradition and Turkish Civilization that the religion of the ancient Turkic states could not be primitive shamanism, which was only a magical part of the religion of the ancient Türks (see a historiography of the problem: Alici 2011, pp. 137–139).

The nature of this religion remains debatable. According to many scholars, it was originally polytheistic, but a monotheistic branch with the sky god Kök-Tengri as the supreme being evolved as a dynastical legitimation. It is at least agreed that Tengrism formed from the various folk religions of the local people and may have had diverse branches.

Some scholars have suggested that Tengrism was a monotheistic religion only at the imperial level in aristocratic circles, and, perhaps, only by the 12th–13th centuries (a late form of development of ancient animistic shamanism in the era of the Mongol Empire).

According to Jean-Paul Roux, the monotheistic concept evolved later out of a polytheistic system and was not the original form of Tengrism. The monotheistic concept helped to legitimate the rule of the dynasty: "As there is only one God in Heaven, there can only be one ruler on the earth ...".

Others have pointed out that Tengri itself was never an Absolute but only one of many gods of the upper world, the sky deity, of polytheistic shamanism, later known as Tengrism.

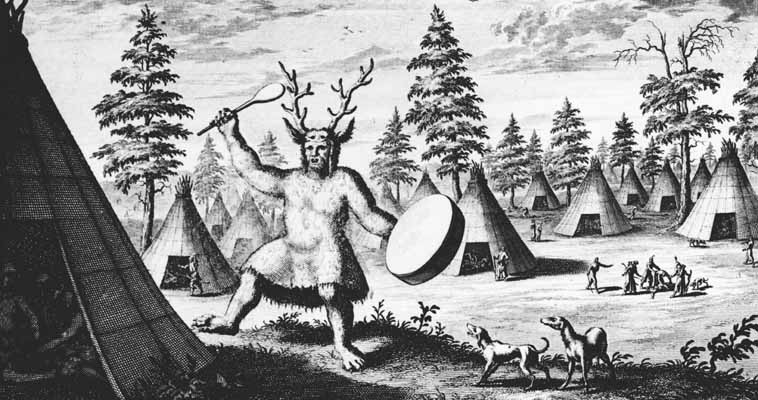
The earliest known depiction of a Siberian shaman, drawn by the Dutch explorer Nicolaes Witsen, who wrote an account of his travels among Samoyedic- and Tungusic-speaking peoples in 1692. Witsen labeled the illustration as a "Priest of the Devil", giving this figure clawed feet to express what he thought were demonic qualities.

Tengrism differs from contemporary Siberian shamanism in that it was a more organized religion. Additionally, the polities practicing it were not small bands of hunter-gatherers like the Paleosiberians, but a continuous succession of pastoral, semi-sedentary khanates and empires from the Xiongnu empire (founded 209 BC) to the Mongol Empire (13th century). In Mongolia, it survives as a synthesis with Tibetan Buddhism while existing in purer forms around Lake Khovsgol and Lake Baikal. Unlike Siberian shamanism, which has no written tradition, Tengrism can be identified from Turkic and Mongolic historical texts like the Orkhon inscriptions, the Secret History of the Mongols, and Altan Tobchi. However, these texts are more historically oriented and are not strictly religious texts like the scriptures and sutras of sedentary civilizations, which have elaborate doctrines and religious stories.

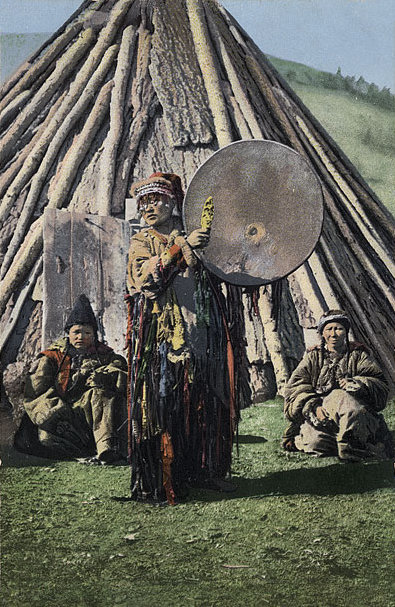
Russian postcard based on a photo taken in 1908 by S. I. Borisov, showing a female shaman, of probable Khakas ethnicity.

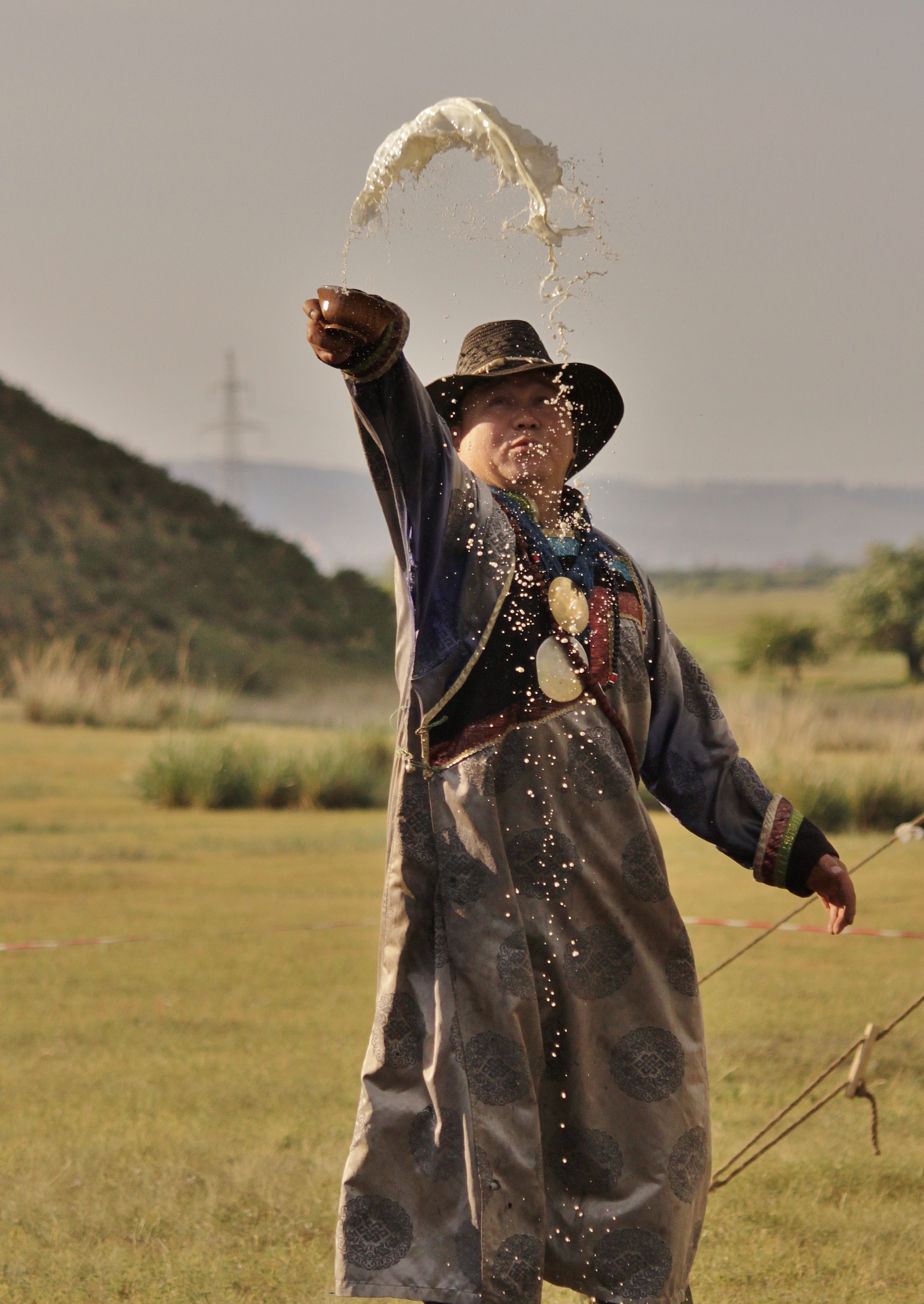
Buryat shaman performing a libation

Terms for "shaman" and "shamaness" in Siberian languages:

- 'shaman': saman (Nedigal, Nanay, Ulcha, Orok), sama (Manchu). The variant /šaman/ (i.e., pronounced "shaman") is Evenk (whence it was borrowed into Russian).
- 'shaman': alman, olman, wolmen (Yukagir)
- 'shaman': [qam] (Tatar, Shor, Oyrat), [xam] (Tuva, Tofalar)
- The Buryat word for shaman is бөө (böö) [bøː], from early Mongolian böge.
- 'shaman': ńajt (Khanty, Mansi), from Proto-Uralic *nojta (cf. Sámi noaidi)
- 'shamaness': [iduɣan] (Mongol), [udaɣan] (Yakut), udagan (Buryat), udugan (Evenki, Lamut), odogan (Nedigal). Related forms found in various Siberian languages include utagan, ubakan, utygan, utügun, iduan, or duana. All these are related to the Mongolian name of Etügen, the hearth goddess, and Etügen Eke "mother Earth". Maria Czaplicka points out that Siberian languages use words for male shamans from diverse roots, but the words for female shaman are almost all from the same root. She connects this with the theory that women's practice of shamanism was established earlier than men's and that "shamans were originally female".

Buryat scholar Irina S. Urbanaeva developed a theory of Tengrist esoteric traditions in Central Asia after the collapse of the Soviet Union and the revival of national sentiment in the former Soviet republics of Central Asia.

== Historical Tengrism ==
Tengri in Old Turkic script (written from right to left as Тeŋiri)

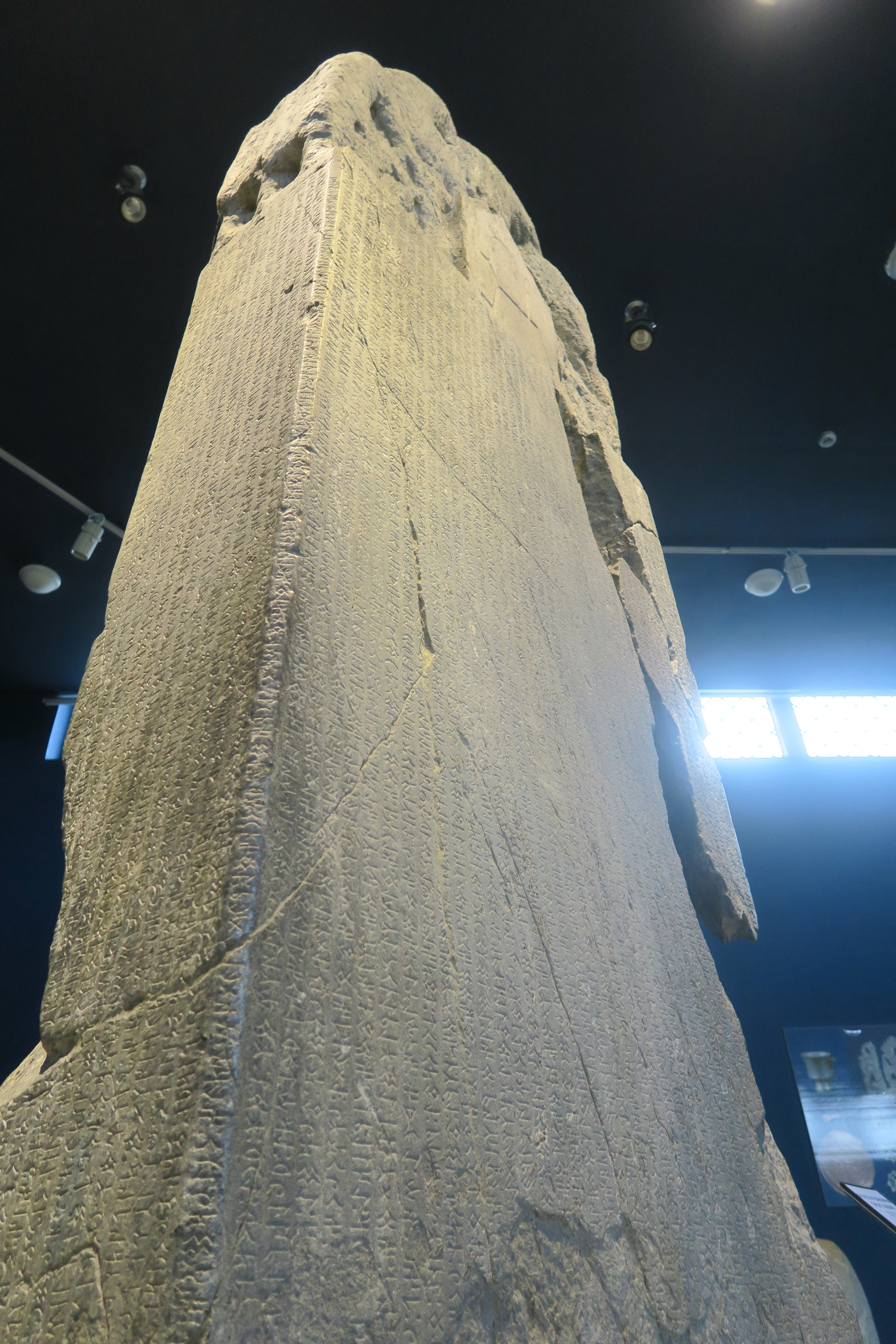
Kul Tigin monument, 8th century

The first time the name Tengri was recorded in Chinese chronicles was in the 4th century BC as the sky god of the Xiongnu, using the Chinese form 撐犁 (chēnglí, Old Chinese /*rtʰaːŋ.riːl/).

Tengrism formed from the various Turkic and Mongolic folk religions, which had a diverse number of deities, spirits, and gods. Turkic folk religion was based on animism and was similar to various other religious traditions of Siberia, Central Asia, and Northeast Asia. Ancestor worship played an important part in Tengrism.

The cult of Heaven-Tengri is fixed by the Orkhon, or Old Turkic script used by the Göktürks ("celestial Turks") and other early khanates during the 8th to 10th centuries.

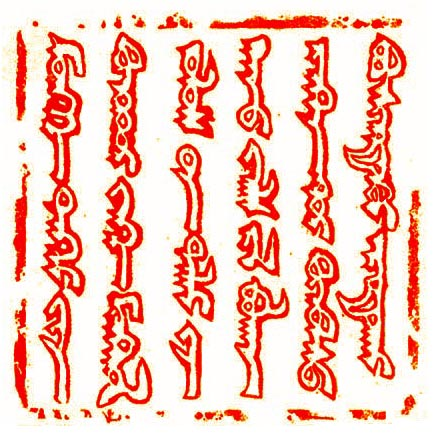
Seal from Güyüg Khan's letter to Pope Innocent IV, 1246. The first four words, from top to bottom, left to right, read möngke ṭngri-yin küčündür – "under the power of the eternal heaven". The words "Tngri" (Tengri) and "zrlg" (zarlig) exhibit vowel-less archaism.

Tengrism most probably existed in medieval states in Eurasia, such as the Göktürk Khaganate, Western Turkic Khaganate, Old Great Bulgaria, Danube Bulgaria, Volga Bulgaria, and Eastern Tourkia (Khazaria) Turkic beliefs contain the sacral book Irk Bitig from the Uyghur Khaganate.

Tengrism also played a large role in the religion of the Mongol Empire as the primary state spirituality. Genghis Khan and several generations of his followers were Tengrian believers and "shaman-kings" until his fifth-generation descendant, Özbeg Khan, turned to Islam in the 14th century. Old Tengrist prayers have come to us from the Secret History of the Mongols (13th century). The priests-prophets (temujin) received them, according to their faith, from the great deity/spirit Munkh Tenger.

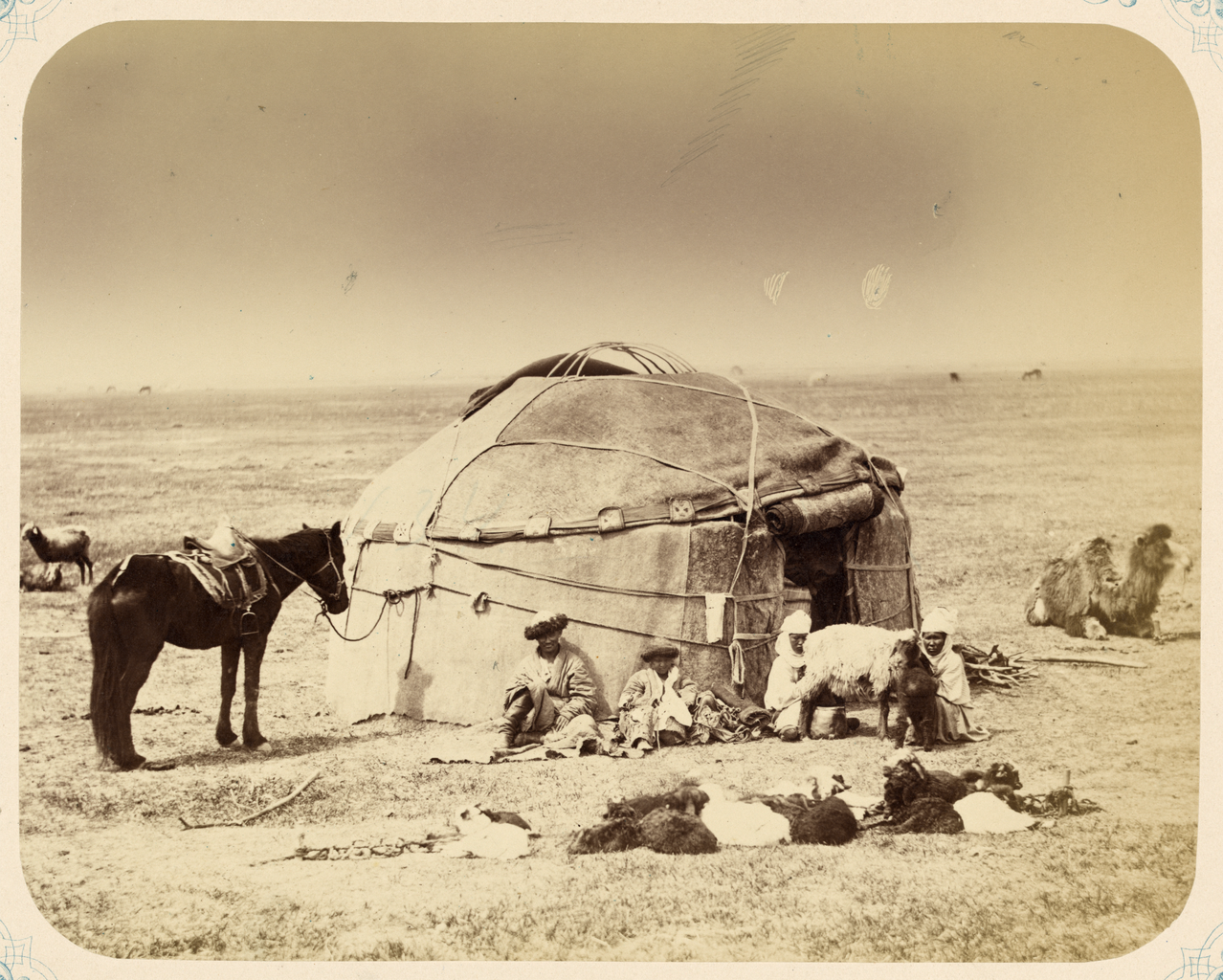
A traditional Kyrgyz yurt in the 1860s in Syr-Darya Oblast. Note the lack of a compression ring at the top.

Tengrism was probably similar to the folk traditions of the Tungusic peoples, such as the Manchu folk religion. Similarities with Korean shamanism and Wuism as well as Japanese Shinto are also evident.

According to Hungarian archaeological research, the religion of the Magyars (Hungarians) until the end of the 10th century (before Christianity) was a form of Tengrism and shamanism.

Tengrists view their existence as sustained by the eternal blue sky (Tengri), the fertile mother-earth spirit (Eje), and a ruler regarded as the chosen one by the holy spirit of the sky. Heaven, earth, spirits of nature, and ancestors provide for every need and protect all humans. By living an upright, respectful life, a human will keep his world in balance and perfect his personal Wind Horse, or spirit. The Huns of the northern Caucasus reportedly believed in two gods: Tangri Han (or Tengri Khan), considered identical to the Persian Esfandiyār and for whom horses were sacrificed, and Kuar (whose victims are struck by lightning).

Traditional Tengrism was more embraced by the nomadic Turks than by those residing in the lower mountains or forests. This belief influenced Turkic and Mongol religious history since ancient times until the 14th century, when the Golden Horde converted to Islam. From then on, Tengrism was mostly submerged by other religious ideas. Traditional Tengrism persists among the Mongols and in some Turkic and Mongolic-influenced regions of Russia (Sakha, Buryatia, and Tuva), in parallel with other religions.

=== Orkhon inscriptions ===
According to the Orkhon inscriptions, Tengri played a big role in choices of the kaghan and in guiding his actions. Many of these were performed because "Heaven so ordained" (Old Turkic: Teŋіri yarïlqaduq üčün).

=== Arghun's letters ===
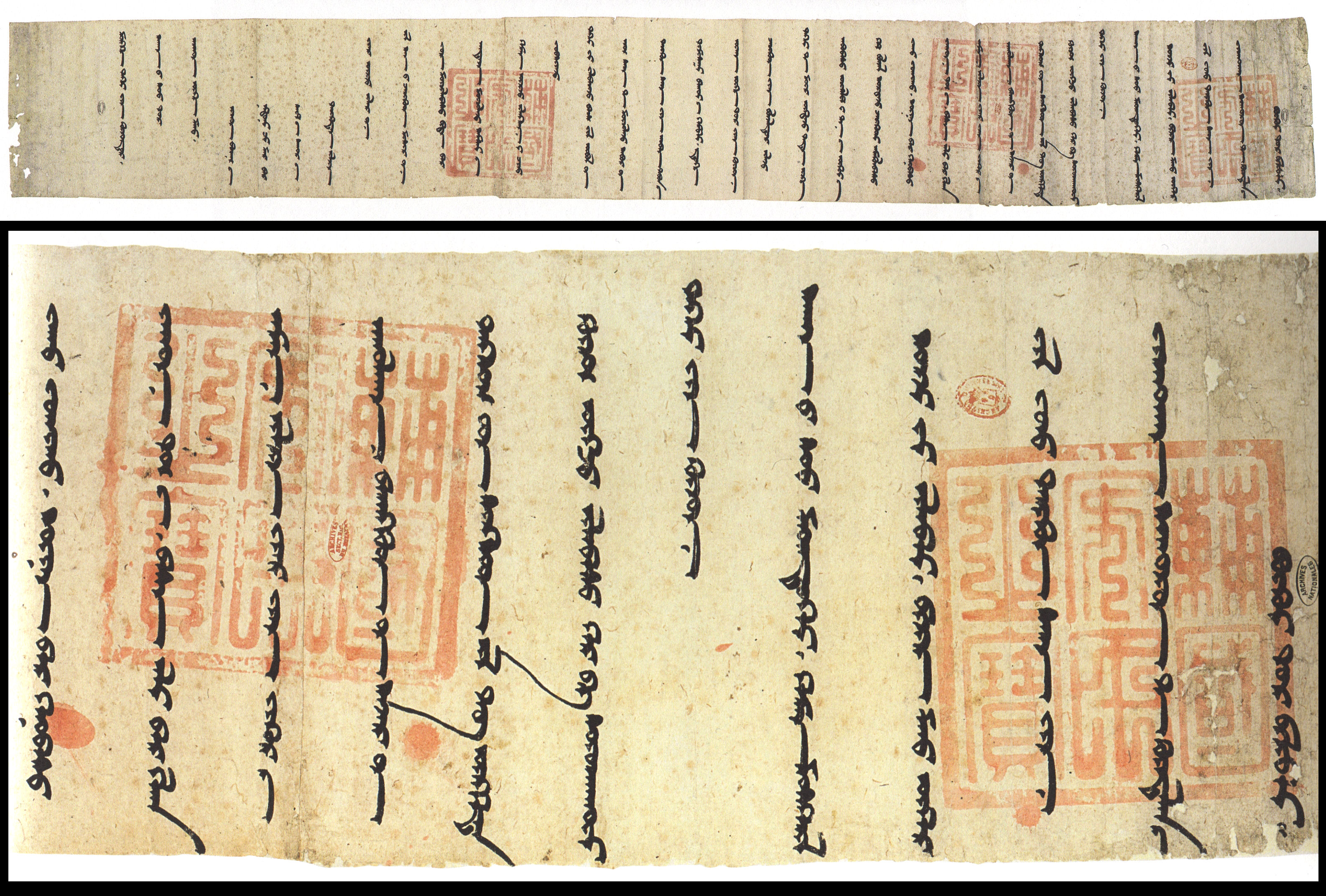
Arghun Khan's 1289 letter to Philip the Fair, in classical Mongolian script. The letter was given to the French king by Buscarel of Gisolfe.

The Mongol ruler Arghun expressed the association of Tengri with imperial legitimacy and military success. The majesty (suu) of the khan is a divine stamp granted by Tengri to a chosen individual, through which Tengri controls the world order (the presence of Tengri in the khan). In this letter, "Tengri" or "Mongke Tengri" ("Eternal Heaven") is at the top of the sentence. In the middle of the magnified section, the phrase Tengri-yin Kuchin ("power of Tengri") forms a pause before being followed by the phrase Khagan-u Suu ("majesty of the khan"):

Under the Power of the Eternal Tengri. Under the Majesty of the Khan (Kublai Khan). Arghun Our word. To the Ired Farans (King of France). Last year you sent your ambassadors led by Mar Bar Sawma telling Us: "if the soldiers of the Il-Khan ride in the direction of Misir (Egypt) we ourselves will ride from here and join you", which words We have approved and said (in reply) "praying to Tengri (Heaven) We will ride on the last month of winter on the year of the tiger and descend on Dimisq (Damascus) on the 15th of the first month of spring." Now, if, being true to your words, you send your soldiers at the appointed time and, worshipping Tengri, we conquer those citizens (of Damascus together), We will give you Orislim (Jerusalem). How can it be appropriate if you were to start amassing your soldiers later than the appointed time and appointment? What would be the use of regretting afterwards? Also, if, adding any additional messages, you let your ambassadors fly (to Us) on wings, sending Us luxuries, falcons, whatever precious articles and beasts there are from the land of the Franks, the Power of Tengri (Tengri-yin Kuchin) and the Majesty of the Khan (Khagan-u Suu) only knows how We will treat you favorably. With these words We have sent Muskeril (Buscarello) the Khorchi. Our writing was written while We were at Khondlon on the sixth khuuchid (6th day of the old moon) of the first month of summer on the year of the cow.

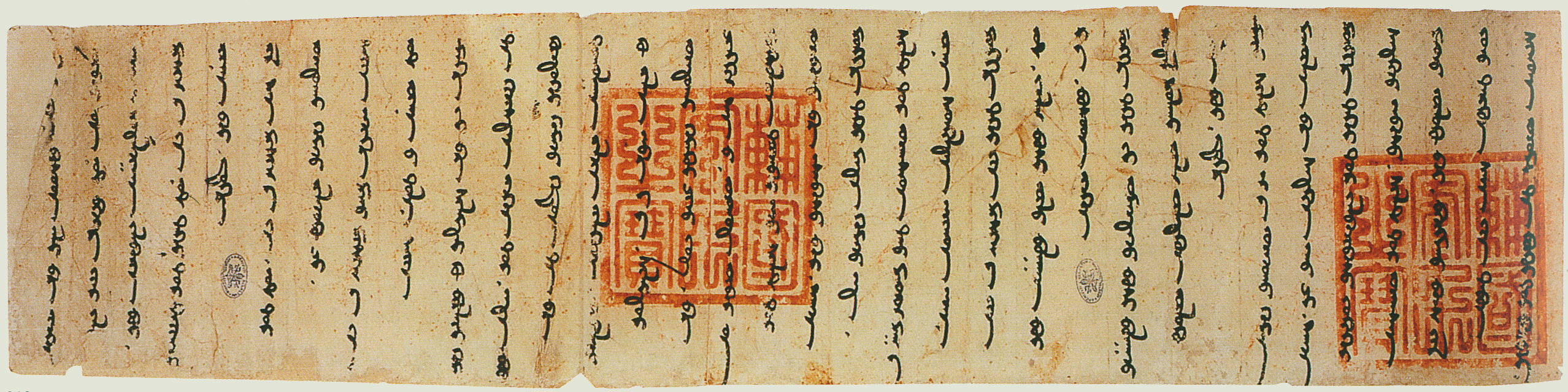
1290 letter from Arghun to Pope Nicholas IV

Arghun expressed Tengrism's non-dogmatic side. The name Mongke Tengri ("eternal Tengri") is at the top of the sentence in this letter to Pope Nicholas IV, in accordance with Mongolian Tengrist writing rules. The words "Tngri" (Tengri) and "zrlg" (zarlig, decree/order) are still written with vowel-less archaism:

... Your saying "May [the Ilkhan] receive silam (baptism)" is legitimate. We say: "We the descendants of Genghis Khan, keeping our own proper Mongol identity, whether some receive silam or some don't, that is only for Eternal Tengri (Heaven) to know (decide)." People who have received silam and who, like you, have a truly honest heart and are pure, do not act against the religion and orders of the Eternal Tengri and of Misiqa (Messiah or Christ). Regarding the other peoples, those who, forgetting the Eternal Tengri and disobeying him, are lying and stealing, are there not many of them? Now, you say that we have not received silam, you are offended and harbor thoughts of discontent. [But] if one prays to Eternal Tengri and carries righteous thoughts, it is as much as if he had received silam. We have written our letter in the year of the tiger, the fifth of the new moon of the first summer month (May 14th, 1290), when we were in Urumi.

=== Tengrism in the Secret History of the Mongols ===
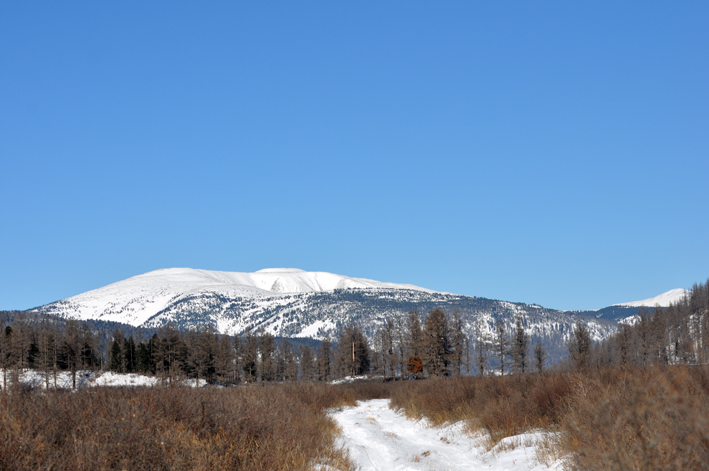
Mount Burkhan Khaldun is a place where Genghis Khan regularly prayed to Tengri.

Tengri is mentioned many times in The Secret History of the Mongols, written in 1240. The book starts by listing the ancestors of Genghis Khan, starting from Borte Chino (Blue Wolf), born with "destiny from Tengri". Bodonchar Munkhag, the 9th-generation ancestor of Genghis Khan, is called a "son of Tengri". Genghis Khan is said to have encountered Tengri in the mountains at the age of 12, and the narrative subsequently mentions Tengri or alludes to Genghis Khan invoking the deity on numerous occasions.

== Contemporary Tengrism ==
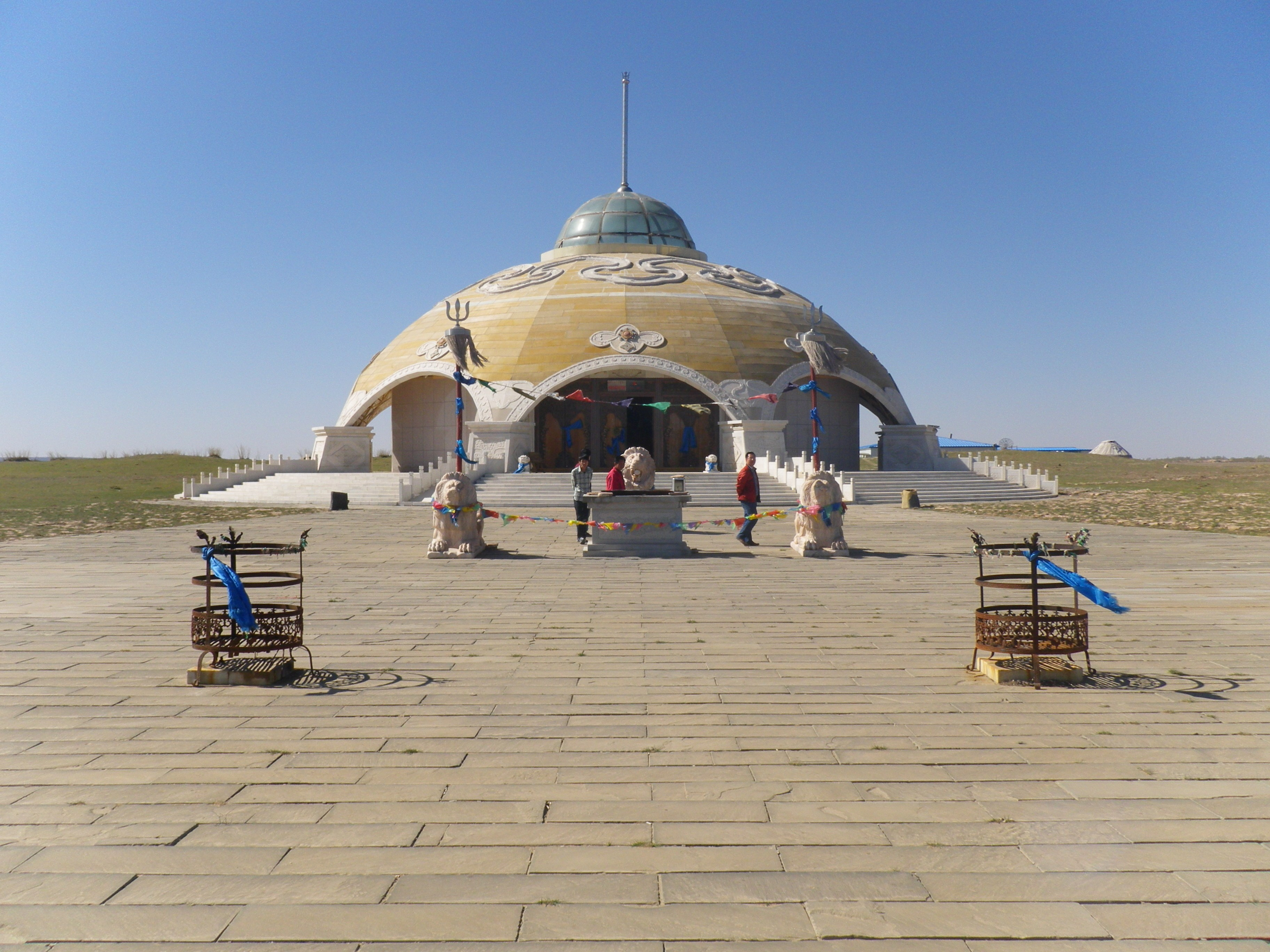
White Sülde Tngri temple in the town of Uxin Banner in Inner Mongolia, China

A revival of Tengrism has played a role in the search for native spiritual roots and a Pan-Turkish ideology since the 1990s, especially in Kyrgyzstan, Kazakhstan, Mongolia, some autonomous republics of the Russian Federation (Tatarstan, Bashkortostan, Buryatia, Yakutia, and others), as well as among the Crimean Karaites and Crimean Tatars.

After the 1908 Young Turk Revolution, and especially after the proclamation of the Turkish republic in 1923, a nationalist ideology of Turanism and Kemalism contributed to the revival of Tengrism. Islamic censorship was abolished, which permitted objective study of the pre-Islamic religion of the Turks. A number of figures, while they did not officially abandon Islam, adopted Turkic names, such as Mustafa Kemal Atatürk (Atatürk – "father of Turks") and the historian of religion and ideologist of the Kemalist regime Ziya Gökalp (Gökalp – "sky hero").

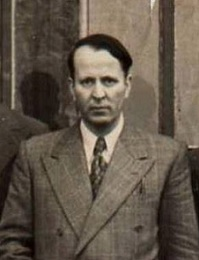
Nihal Atsız (1905–1975), one of the first ideologists of modern Tengrism

The Turkish writer and historian Nihal Atsız was Tengrist and an ideologue of Turanism. The followers of Tengrism in the paramilitary organisation Grey Wolves, mainly inspired by his work, replace the Arabic designation of the god "Allah" with the Turkish "Tanri" in the oath and pronounce: "Tanrı Türkü Korusun" (Tengri, bless the Türks!).

Prominent modern ideologues and theorists of Tengrism include Murad Adji (1944–2018), Sabetkazy Akatai (1938–2003), Aron Atabek, Nurmagambet Ayupov (1955–2010), Rafael Bezertinov, Shagdaryn Bira, Firdus Devbash, Yosif Dmitriev (Trer) (1947–2018), Mongush Kenin-Lopsan, Auezkhan Kodar (1958–2016), Choiun Omuraliyev, Dastan Sarygulov, and Olzhas Suleimenov.

The poet, literary critic, and Turkologist Olzhas Suleimenov, eulogist of the Kazakh national identity, in his book AZ-and-IA, which was banned after publication in 1975 in Soviet Kazakhstan, presented Tengrism ("Tengrianstvo") as one of the most ancient religions in the world.

Tengrism's revival of an ethnic religion has reached a larger audience in intellectual circles. Former presidents Nursultan Nazarbayev of Kazakhstan and Askar Akayev of Kyrgyzstan have called Tengrism the "natural" religion of the Turkic peoples. During his 2002 visit to Khakassia in Russia, Akayev said that seeing the Yenisei Inscriptions was 'like a pilgrimage to a holy place for the Kyrgyz people', drawing a comparison with the Islamic pilgrimage to Mecca.

Between 1990 and 1993, the Yakut philologist Lazar Afanasyev-Teris founded the Tengrist organisation Kut-Siur, which later became Aiyy Faith. The headquarters of the International Fund of Tengri Research is also located in Yakutsk. In Tatarstan, a Tengrist periodical, Beznen-Yul, appeared in 1997.

Several Kyrgyz politicians have advocated for Tengrism as a way to fill a perceived ideological void. Dastan Sarygulov, secretary of state and former chair of the Kyrgyz state gold-mining company, in 2005 established Tengir Ordo—a civic group promoting the values and traditions of Tengrism.

The Soviet and Ukrainian artist and public figure David Rebi (1922–2019) was a proponent of Tengrist revival among Crimean Karaites and Krymchaks.

A related movement known as Burkhanism arose in 1904 in the Altai Republic, whose proponents include the painter Grigory Gurkin and the poet Paslei Samyk) Among the Chuvash people of Russia exists the revivalist religion known as Vattisen Yaly, which is considered a form of Tengrism.

Some Bulgarians identify as descendants of the Turkic Bulgars and practice a modern version of Tengrism. They are part of the Tangra Warriors Movement (Bulgarian: Движение "Воини на Тангра").

In 2003 in Bishkek, Kyrgyzstan, Tengir Ordo held the first international scientific symposium on Tengrism. In 2005, the French Institute for Central Asia Studies organized a conference on Tengrism in Almaty, Kazakhstan. Since 2007, biennial scientific conferences on Tengrism have been held in Russia, Mongolia, and other countries.

== Beliefs ==
Tengrism is an animistic, all-encompassing system of belief that includes medicine, religion, a reverence of nature, and ancestor worship. Tengrism as a monotheistic religion developed only at the imperial level in aristocratic circles.

=== Gods ===
Tengrism is centered on the worship of Tengri gods and in particular, the sky deity Gök Tengri (Heaven, God of Heaven). It is known as Tangara to the Yakut. While Gök Tengri always remains abstract, never depicted in anthropomorphic or zoomorphic forms, other deities are often personified.

Itugen, an earth or fertility deity, often accompanies Tengri.

The total number of deities believed to exist within Tengrism varies from population to population. Deities may be related to natural aspects of the world, such as earth, water, fire, the Sun, the Moon, stars, air, clouds, wind, storms, thunder and lightning, and rain and rainbows. Animals were thought to be totemistic symbols for specific gods, like sheep being associated with fire, cows with water, horses with wind, and camels with earth.

Other deities include:

- Umay ("placenta, afterbirth") is the goddess of children and babies' souls. She is the daughter of Tengri.
- Kayra is the primordial god of highest sky, upper air, space, atmosphere, light, and life, and is a son of Gök Tengri.
- Ülgen is the son of Kayra and Umay and is the god of goodness.
- Mergen is the son of Kayra and the brother of Ülgen. He represents mind and intelligence and sits on the seventh level of the sky.
- Erlik is the god of death and the underworld, known as Tamag.
- Ay Dede is the moon god.
- Natigai is the god of pregnancy, children, livestock, wives, and health.

The highest group in the pantheon consisted of 99 tngri (55 of them benevolent or "white" and 44 terrifying or "black"); 77 "earth-spirits"; and others. The tngri were called upon only by leaders and great shamans and were common to all the clans. After these, three groups of ancestral spirits dominated: The "Lord-Spirits" were the souls of clan leaders to whom any member of a clan could appeal for physical or spiritual help. The "Protector-Spirits" included the souls of great shamans. The "Guardian-Spirits" were made up of the souls of smaller shamans and were associated with a specific locality (including mountains, rivers, etc.) in the clan's territory. Nonhuman beings (İye), neither necessarily personified nor deified, are revered as sacred essences of things. These beings include natural phenomena such as sacred trees or mountains.

=== Three-world cosmology ===
The Tengrist cosmology proposes a division between the upper worlds (heaven), the Earth, and the world of darkness (underworld). These worlds are inhabited by different beings, often spirits or deities. A shaman (kam) can communicate with these spirits using mental powers. The worlds are not entirely separated, and they have constant influence on the Earth.

In Turkic mythology within Siberian Central Asian religious systems, there is the "celestial world", the ground to which "earth-water" (yer-su) belongs, and the "underworld", ruled by spirits beneath the earth. They are connected through the world tree in the center of the worlds.

The celestial and subterranean worlds are divided into seven layers, although there are variations (the underworld sometimes has nine layers and the celestial world 17). Shamans are able to find entries to travel into these realms. In the multiples of these realms, there are beings, living just like humans on Earth. They also have their own respected souls and shamans and nature spirits. Sometimes, these beings visit the Earth but are invisible to people. They manifest themselves only in a strange sizzling fire or a bark to the shaman.

==== Heavenly world ====
The heavens are inhabited by righteous souls, the Creator, and protector deities. The celestial world has many similarities with the Earth, but it is undefiled by humans. It contains a pristine, untouched nature, and the natives have never deviated from the traditions of their ancestors. This realm is much brighter than the Earth and is under the auspices of Ulgen, a son of Tengri. Shamans can also visit this world.

On some days, the doors of this heavenly world are opened, and the light shines through the clouds. During this moment, the prayers of the shamans are most influential. A shaman performs his imaginary journey, which takes him to the heavens, by riding a black bird, a deer, or a horse, or by changing into the shape of these animals. Otherwise, he may scale the world tree or cross a rainbow.

==== Subterranean world ====
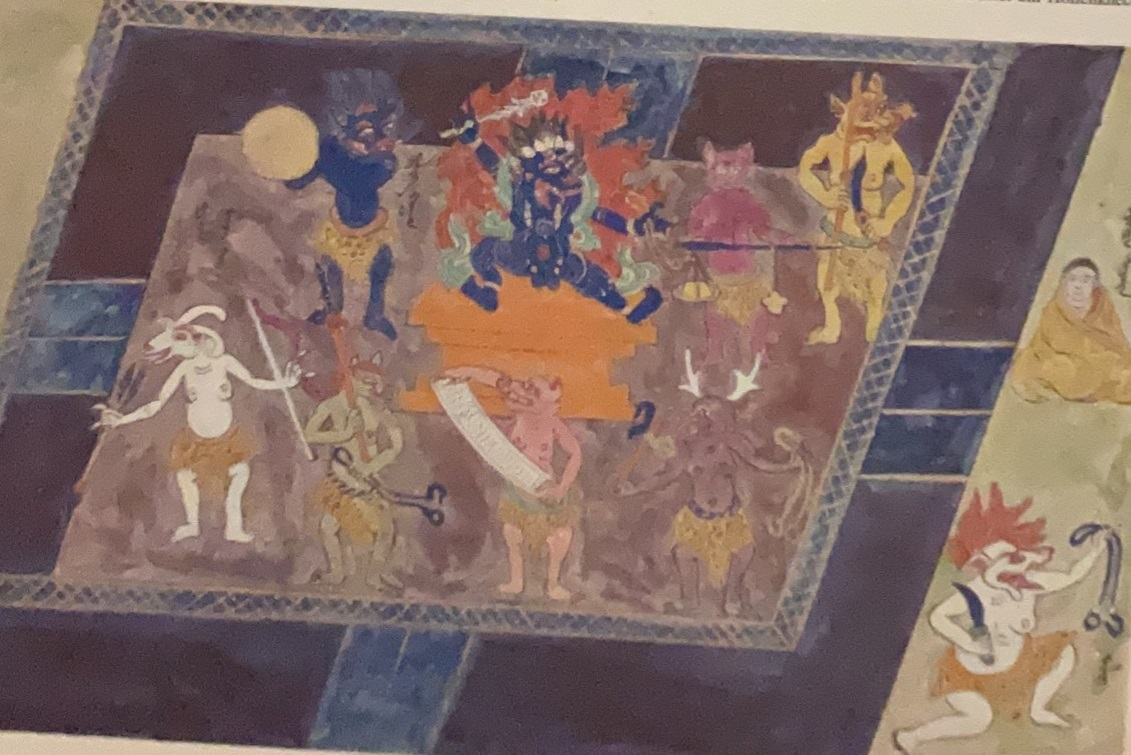
The city of the infernal underworld ruled by Erlik-Khan. In front of him, a hell warden is reading the scrolls of sins and virtues.

The underworld is the abode of wicked souls, devils, and evil deities. There are many similarities between the Earth and the underworld, and its inhabitants resemble humans, though they have only two souls instead of three. They lack the "Ami soul", which produces body temperature and allows breathing. Therefore, they are pale, and their blood is dark. The sun and the moon of the underworld give far less light than the sun and the moon of the Earth. There are also forests, rivers, and settlements underground.

Erlik Khan (Mongolian: Erleg Khan), one of the sons of Tengri, is the ruler of the underworld. He controls the souls there, some of them waiting to be reborn. Extremely evil souls are believed to be extinguished forever here. If a sick human is not dead yet, a shaman can move to the underworld to negotiate with Erlik to bring the person back to life. If he fails, the person dies.

=== Souls ===
It is believed that people and animals have many souls. Generally, each person is considered to have three souls, but the names, characteristics, and numbers of the souls may differ among tribes: For example, Samoyeds, a Uralic tribe living in the north of Siberia, believe that women have four and men five. Since animals also have souls, humans must respect them.

In addition to these souls, Jean-Paul Roux draws attention to the "Özkonuk" spirit mentioned in the writings from the Buddhist periods of the Uyghurs.

Julie Stewart, who devoted her life to doing research in Mongolia, described the belief in souls in one of her articles:

- Amin: Provides breathing and body temperature. It is the soul that invigorates.
- Sünesün: Outside of the body, this soul moves through water. It is the soul that reincarnates. After a human died, this soul moves to the world tree, before entering a newborn child.
- Sülde: The soul that provides personality. If the other souls leave the body, the person loses consciousness, but if this soul leaves, the human dies. This soul resides in nature after death and is not reborn.

=== Anthropology ===
Humans are the product of (father) Heaven and (mother) Earth. Records of Old Turkic inscriptions tell about the beginning of humans as follows:

"When the blue Heaven above and the brown Earth beneath arose, between them twain Mankind arose."

By that, Tengrism favors an ecocentric theological system over an anthropocentric one. Tengrism sanctifies human relationship with nature (which might be personified or not) and their relationship with the sky. Contrary to the Abrahamic account on anthropogeny, Tengrism does not place humans above nature, rather considering mankind as part of nature, without any special rank assigned by God.

=== Creation story ===
There is no unified creation myth within Tengrist beliefs. However, it is possible to reconstruct beliefs by narratives handed down orally. According to the "Fire Prayer", it is implied that Heaven and Earth were once one but separated later, giving birth to fire (Od). After this separation, life on Earth came into being: rain fell from the heavens, and from the Earth sprouted various lifeforms.

== Tengrism and other religions ==
=== Tengrism and Buddhism ===
Tengrism was assimilated into Mongolian Buddhism, while surviving un-assimilated only in far-northern Mongolia. Tengrist formulas and ceremonies were subsumed into the state religion. The 17th-century Mongolian chronicle Altan Tobchi contains the following prayer at the very end:

Aya gaihamshig huvilgaan bogdos haadiin yazguuriig odii todii tuuhnees
Ayag ha tehimlig shashnaa dara Luvsandanzan guush beer
Ahui ih uls zalgan uztugei hemeen hicheen bichuulsen tuugeer
Amitan buhen tsagaan buyanaar ezlen, amin nasan urt bolood
Amgalan jargalantan boltugai
Erht Tengerees isht haadiin sahiusan beer saitar tetgen ivgeej
Evedchin, zud, totgor, tsag busiin uhel ustan amarlij
Ed tavaar delgeren, ur taria arvidan, nasan buyan nemj
Enh esen amar jargalan, osge hur met olzii hutag orshtugai

Translation:

Aya! (This is) the origin of the marvelous divine Khans from miscellaneous histories,
Collected by the faith-professing monk Luvsandanzan guush [Buddhist title],
Written with effort so that the great nation may read for generations.
By it, may all beings rule through white virtue, living long lives
And become possessors of peace and happiness
With the spirits of the Khans descended from mighty Tengri blessing thoroughly!
May sickness, zud, obstacles, and untimely death be removed and pacified!
May merchandise spread, crops flourish, and longevity increase!
May peaceful health and happiness prevail and auspicious luck come like rain!

The figure of the Mongolian god of war (Daichin Tengri) was iconographically depicted in Buddhist-influenced form and carried into battle by certain armies. During the Napoleonic Wars, the Kalmyk prince Serebzhab Tyumen (1774–1858) and 500 Kalmyks from his second cavalry regiment, as well as 500 Kalmyks of the first regiment of Prince Jamba-Taishi Tundutov, carried the yellow banner of Daichin Tengri through the battles of Borodino, Warsaw, Leipzig, Fère-Champenoise (1814) as well as the capture of Paris. In early 1921, the Buddhist baron Roman von Ungern-Sternberg (1886–1921) was reportedly recognized as Daichin Tengri by the Bogd Khan of Mongolia. James Palmer, in his book The Bloody White Baron, quotes Ferdynand Ossendowski who claims that Ungern-Sternberg's imminent death was foretold on three separate occasions:

As the bones blackened, she began to examine them and then suddenly her face took on an expression of fear and pain. She nervously tore off the kerchief which bound her head and, contracted with convulsions, began snapping out short sharp phrases. 'I see...I see the God of War...His life runs out...horribly...After it a shadow...black like the night...Shadow...One hundred thirty steps remain...Beyond darkness...Nothing...I see nothing...the God of War has disappeared.' Baron Ungern dropped his head. The woman fell over on her back with her arms stretched out. She had fainted, but it seemed to me that I noticed once a bright pupil of one of her eyes showing from under the closed lashes. Two Buriats carried the lifeless form, after which a long silence reigned in the yurta of the Buriat Prince. Baron Ungern finally got up and began to walk around the brazier, whispering to himself.

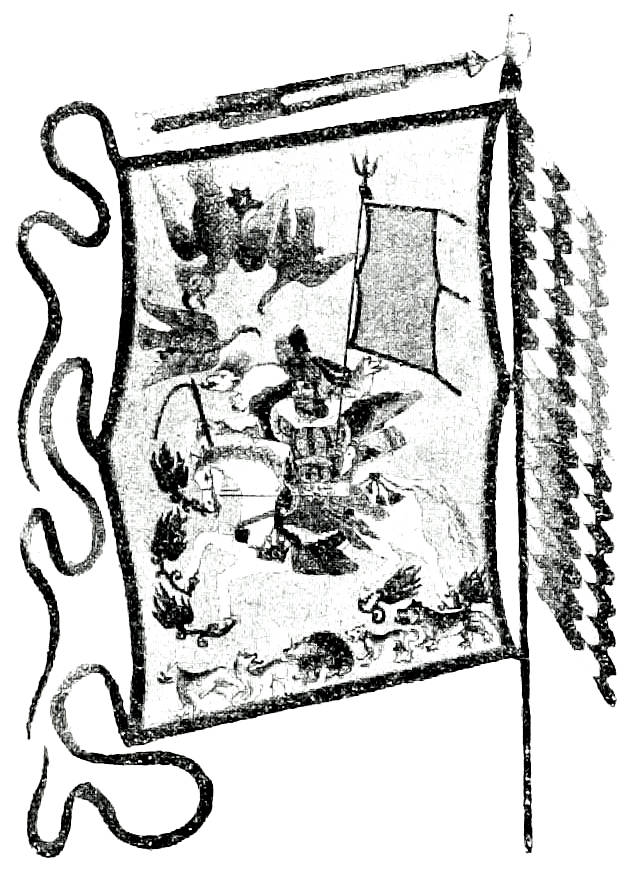
Banner of Daichin Tengri, carried into battle during the Napoleonic Wars

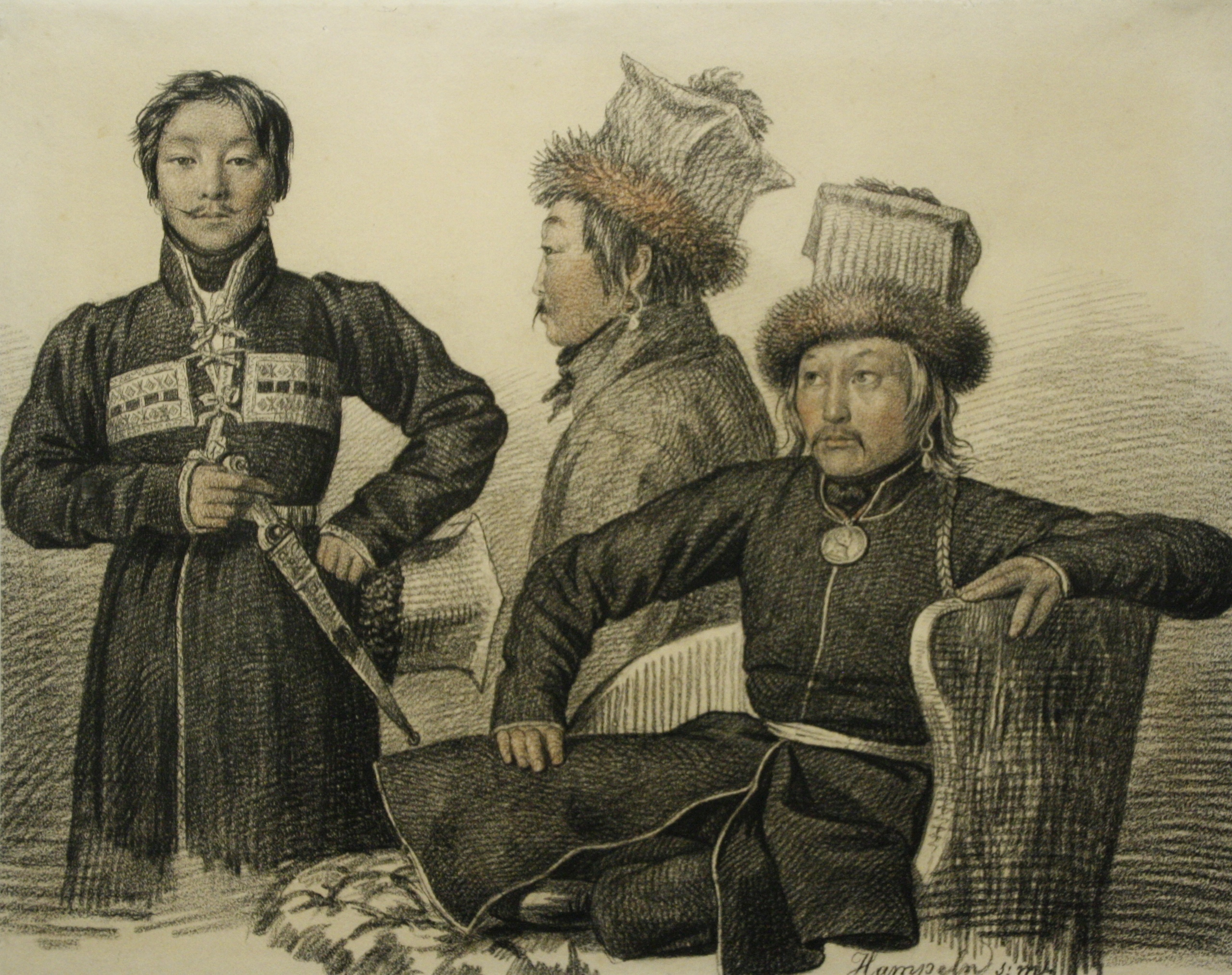
Serebzhab Tyumen (seated) carried the banner of Daichin Tengri into the Battle of Fère-Champenoise (1814).

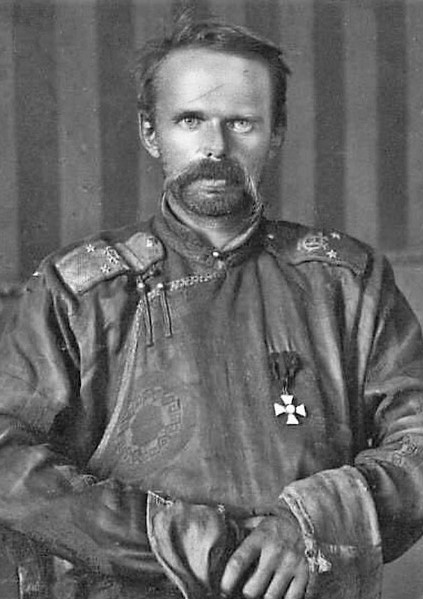
Baron Ungern was called the God of War (Daichin Tengri) by certain Mongols.

=== Tengrism and Islam ===
==== Conversion ====
The most likely route of conversion to Islam for the Turks has been via Sufism, identifying Dervishes as something akin to shamans. In the writings of Ahmad Yasawi, both Tengrist elements as well as Islamic themes can be found. For example, Muhammad features as the prototype of humanity's way to unite with God, and the Turks simultaneously refer to God as both kok tangir (Gök Tengri) or Allah. Turkic and Mongolic peoples in Central Asia largely converted to Islam during the fourteenth century, with a strong focus on inwardly and personal experience. Thus, many scholars have argued for a syncretism between Orthodox Islam, Sufism, and pre-Islamic Turkic religion. The sociologist Rakhat Achylova studied how aspects of Tengrism were adopted into a Kyrgyz form of Islam.

More recently, the syncretism theory has been challenged. Some scholars have argued that an orthodox Islam simply did not exist during the Medieval period but has instead been a product of Modernization, thus, there was no strong distinction between Islam and pre-Islamic Turkic beliefs when the first Turkic empires converted. First contact between shamanistic Turks and Islam took place during the Battle of Talas against the Chinese Tang dynasty. Many shamanistic beliefs were considered genuinely Islamic by many average Muslims and are still prevalent today. Turkic Tengrism further influenced parts of Sufism and folk Islam, especially Bektashism, whose affiliation to Islam became disputed in the late Ottoman period.

The Medieval Syriac historian Michael the Syrian (1166–1199) describes the Turk conversion from Tengrism to Islam in one of his surviving text fragments. He mentions three reasons for Turkic conversion:

First: as we said above, the Turks have always proclaimed one God, already in their land of origin, even though they considered the invisible firmament as God. [...] They think in fact that the sky is the unique God. So when they heard the Arabs speak about one God, they adhered to their religion. The second way: the Turks who came first and went to the land of Margiana [the region of Merv in today's Turkmenistan] and settled there arrived at the time of the Persians. After a while Muhammad appeared and was accepted by the Arabs, and then by the Persians too. [...] So the Turks who had migrated to the land of Margiana joined Islam, just like the Persian people and the race of the Kurds. And when the new Turks who arrived afterwards met their people and those who spoke their language, they also turned to the customs they found the others had taken up, following their lead. The third way of the Turks' union with the Tayyaye [Arabs] was the following: since the Arabs used to take the Turks with them as mercenaries in the war against the Greeks, and they would enter these prosperous regions and feed on the booty, they would listen to the Arabs and accept the word of Muhammad who said that by giving up the worship of idols and other created things [...]."

Jonathan Z. Brack noted that Muslim debaters and mystics convinced the Khans of their divine appointment as predicted within Islamic tradition as a mujaddid, one who restores the religion. However, since reviver still ranks beneath the prophets, the converting Khans lost the freedom of religious ambiguity to an interpretative framework set by religious scripture. For example, Rashid-ad-Din's concept of Öljeitü's divine knowledge, places him above the common people, an Islamic legitimacy and even sacred aura, but attached his kingship to monotheistic concepts, which led "ultimately to the rejection and displacement of the Chinggisid's affinity with Tenggeri".

==== Contemporary views ====
Tengrism is based on personal relationship with gods and spirits that cannot be set in writing. Thus, it can have no prophets, holy scriptures, place of worship, clergy, dogma, rites, or prayers. In contrast, orthodox Islam is based on a written corpus. Doctrines and religious law derive from the Quran and are explained by hadith. In this regard, the two belief systems are fundamentally distinct.

Others, on the other hand, assert that Tengri is indeed synonymous with Allah and that Turkic ancestors did not leave their former belief behind but simply accepted "Allah" as a new expression for "Tengri". Shoqan Walikhanov wrote that only the names but not the thoughts became Islamic. Thus, Gök Tengri was called Allah, and Tengrist demons became div, peri, or jinn, but the idea behind them remained shamanic.

=== Tengrism and Christianity ===
Hulegu Khan sent a letter in Latin to King Louis IX of France on 10 April 1262, from his capital of Maragheh, in Iran. Kept in the Vienna National Library as MS 339, it is both an invitation for joint operations against the Mamluks as well as an imperious command to submit. The letter provides key insights into the Mongols' understanding of Tengrism's relationship to Christianity as well as furnishing one of the first Latin transcriptions of Tengri. Only a few sentences from the lengthy letter are shown below (those with relevance to Tengrism):

Deus...locutus est auo nostro Chingischan per Temptemgri (nomen quod interpretatur propheta dei)
eiusdem cognatum futuros euentus miraculose temporum reuelans eidem per dictumi Teptemgri nunciando
significans: "In excelsis ego sum deus omnipotens solus et te super gentes et regna constitui dominatorem
Nos igitur per uirtutem Mengutengri (id est dei uiui) Huyleu cham, dux milicie Mungalorum
illustri regi Francorum Ludwico uniuersis et singulis tocius regni Francie Barachmar (id est salutem)
Nunciando predictam reuelationem notificamus ut nobis mandatum dei uiui exegentibus eo indubitancius
acquiescere uelitis quo potestatem nostram ab ipso Mengutengri collatam diligencius consideretis

papam Francorum regem uel imperatorem fuisse credidisse, sed postea
diligentiori inquisitione habita intelleximus ipsum esse uirum sanctum deum iugiter orantem
pro nationibus uniuersis ipsius Misicatengrin (id est filii dei uiui)

Mangutengri (id est in uiuo deo) eternaliter sine fine ualete
Datum in ciuitate Maraga anno decimo, Nochoe, die decima mensis Aprilis

Translation:

God...spoke to our grandfather Genghis Khan by Teb Tengri (meaning Prophet of God)
His relative, miraculously revealing the future through the same Teb Tengri
Saying: "On high, I alone am God Almighty and made you lord over peoples and kingdoms"
We, by the power of Mengutengri (living God), Hulegu Khan, leader of the Mongol army
To Louis, illustrious King of the Franks and to all France, Barachmar (greetings)
Revealing the above revelation we notify you to follow the command of God
Considering well that we received our power from the same Mengutengri

We thought the Pope was a King of France or an emperor, but later,
After diligent enquiry, understood he is a holy man who prays to God incessantly
On behalf of all the nations of Misicatengrin (that is, the son of the living God)

Mangutengri (that is, the living God) eternally without end farewell
Given in the city of Maragha the tenth year, Nochoe (dog year), 10 April

The letter largely propounds the usual Mongol ideology and understanding of Tengrism, with mentions of the supreme shaman Kokochu Teb Tengri. All meanings of Tengri including the sky, the most high God, and "a god", are implied in the letter. Jesus Christ is called Misicatengrin or Messiah-Tengri in the letter. The Misica is from Syriac mshiha (Messiah, Christ) as opposed to Arabic masih. Another Syriac word in the letter is barachmar (greetings). This points to the Nestorian heritage within the Mongol Empire, which used Syriac as its liturgical language. The Mongolian letter of Arghun Khan to Pope Nicholas IV (1290) also uses the word Misica for Christ. William of Rubruck reported that Ariq Böke, brother of Hulegu Khan, used the word Messiah near Karakorum in 1254 (Then they began to blaspheme against Christ, but Arabuccha stopped them saying: "You must not speak so, for we know that the Messiah is God"). There are elements of syncretism between Tengrism and Nestorian Christianity, with overlapping notions of monotheism and a traditional view of Christ as Misicatengrin probably dating back to the Keraite conversion in 1007. In Hulegu's letter, Tengrism takes the overarching, non-dogmatic role and contains Nestorianism as a compatible subset, in line with the religious pluralism practiced by the Mongols. Hulegu himself was not strictly a Christian, although his wife, his general Kitbuqa, and his mother were Nestorians. He was a Tengrist whose Nestorian interests were of the Mongol, syncretic type. His successor, Abaqa Khan, would take part in the Ninth Crusade with the future King Edward of England in 1271 and also storm the Krak des Chevaliers in February 1281, with the Hospitallers of Margat.

Due to the claim that there is only one eternal Tengri in heaven, many Christians believed Tengri refers to the Christian God. However, it is clear from a letter by Güyük Khan, sent to the Pope, that the Mongols would not convert to Christianity, because they would not obey the word of Möngke Tengri (Eternal God).

== Contemporary era ==
=== Mongolia ===
In Mongolia, Tengrism continues to be practised by a small percentage of the population.

=== Modern revival ===
Tengrism, as a form of Central Asian shamanism, has experienced a revival following the dissolution of the Soviet Union in 1991. In Kyrgyzstan, Tengrism was suggested as a pan-Turkic national ideology following the 2005 presidential elections by an ideological committee chaired by state secretary Dastan Sarygulov. In 2014, an attempt was made by Tengrist followers to get recognition of the religion by collecting 5,000 signatures and submitting them to the government, though the motion was ultimately not recognized.

Murat Auezov, former head of the National Public Library of Kazakhstan, regards Tengrism as a manifestation of a worldview in which humankind is identified with nature, in contrast to anthropocentric religions.

According to Kazakh writer Ulyana Fatyanova, Tengrism does not have a specific set of laws—Tengri's laws are the laws of the universe (which might include physics, karma, spirits, gods, and so on).

In 2022, the lawyer Burhanettin Mumcuoğlu became the first person in Turkey to officially change his religion from Islam to Tengrism.

=== Academic views ===
According to Jonathan Brack, Tengrism differed from transendentalist religions, to which Tengrism later assimilated to, by an immanentist framework. While transcendentalist religions commit to universal laws, moral truths, and final salvation, immanentist theological approaches are concerned with pragmatic and empirical concerns, such as healing the sick, conversing with supernatural forces or victory in battle. Tengrists welcomed religious and ritual innovations without identifying them as anything new, but considering them as part of continuity with their belief system. For example, the Buddhists, introduced the cosmic ruler and protector of the dharma Cakravartin, who was then identified with Ghenghiz Khan.

He argues Tengrist Khans frequently arranged intellectual discussions and religious debates to educate the ruler, thereby giving the representatives of the religion in question a chance to convert the Khan and ensure political support. The outcome of such religious contests were viewed as guided by heavenly support. As such, Tengrism remained flexible, willing to adapt to new information and integrate new ideas if they appeared to be beneficient. The contenders often relied on rational arguments, while, following the immanentist theology of Tengrism, the Khan favored empirical or spiritual evidence for a claim.

One example Brack uses to make his argument is a theological discussion between Hülegü and a Sufi Shaykh. When the Shaykh laid out the rational arguments in favor of his theological position and scriptural evidence, Hülgeü rejected them on grounds of lack of practical application. Instead, Hülegü demanded empirical proof achieved through supernatural intervention on behalf of the Sufi, which was accomplished when the dervish walked through fire unharmed.

== Demographics ==
In 2024, there were over one million people following Tengrism in Kazakhstan. However, it has not been recognized as one of the official religions there.

In Kyrgyzstan, there were about 50,000 people following Tengrism in 2014. It has also not been recognized as a religion there.

== See also ==
- List of Tengrist movements
- List of Tengrist states and dynasties
- Heaven worship
- Hungarian Native Faith
- Manzan Gurme Toodei
- Nardoqan
- Religion in China
- Uralic neopaganism

== Bibliography ==
=== Secondary sources ===
- Alici, Mustafa (2011). "The Idea of God in Ancient Turkish Religion According to Raffaele Pettazzoni. A Comparison with the Turkish Historian of Religions Hikmet Tanyu". SMSR. 77 (1): 137–54.
- Baldick, Julian (2000). Animals and Shaman: Ancient Religions of Central Asia. New York: NYU Press. ISBN 9780814798720.
- Balzer, Marjorie Mandelstam, ed. (2015) [1990]. Shamanism: Soviet Studies of Traditional Religion in Siberia and Central Asia. London/New York: Routledge. ISBN 9781138179295.
- Beydili, Celal (2005). Türk Mitolojisi Ansiklopedik Sözlük [Turkic Mythology Encyclopedic Dictionary] (in Turkish). İstanbul: Yurt Kitap-Yayın. ISBN 9759025051.
- Bira, Shagdaryn (2011). Монголын тэнгэрийн үзэл: түүвэр зохиол, баримт бичгүүд [Mongolian Tengerism: selected papers and documents] (in Mongolian). Ulaanbaatar: Sodpress. ISBN 9789992955932.
- Bourdeaux, Michael; Filatov, Sergey, eds. (2006). Современная религиозная жизнь России. Опыт систематического описания [Contemporary Religious Life of Russia. Systematic description experience] (in Russian). Vol. 4. Keston Institute. Москва: Логос. ISBN 5-98704-057-4.
- Brent, Peter (1976). The Mongol Empire: Genghis Khan: His Triumph and His Legacy. London: Book Club Associates.
- Dilek, İbrahim (2013). Türk Mitoloji Sözlüğü (Altay-Yakut) [Turkic Mythology Dictionary (Altai-Yakut)] (in Turkish). İstanbul: Gazi Kitabevi.
- Eröz, Mehmet (1992). Eski Türk dini (gök tanrı inancı) ve Alevîlik-Bektaşilik [Old Turkish Religion (Belief in Sky God) and Alevism-Bektashism] (in Turkish) (3rd ed.). İstanbul: Türk Dünyası Araştırmaları Vakfı. ISBN 9789754980516.
- Filatov, Sergey; Shchipkov, Aleksandr (1995). "Religious Developments Among the Volga Nations as a Model for the Russian Federation" (PDF). Religion, State & Society. 23 (3): 233–48. doi:10.1080/09637499508431705.
- Golden, Peter Benjamin (1992). An Introduction to the History of the Turkic peoples: Ethnogenesis and State Formation in Medieval and Early Modern Eurasia and the Middle East. Wiesbaden: Harrassowitz Verlag. ISBN 978-3447032742.
- Gumilyov, Lev N. (1967). "Гл. 7. Религия тюркютов" [Chapter 7. Religion of the Turkuts]. Древние тюрки [The Ancient Turks] (in Russian). Москва: Наука.
- Güngör, Harun (2013). Erdoğan Altinkaynak (ed.). "Tengrism As a Religious and Political Phenomenon in the Turkish World: Tengriyanstvo" (PDF). Karadeni̇z – Black Sea – Черное Море. 19: 189–95. ISSN 1308-6200. Archived from the original (PDF) on 13 August 2016.
- Güngör, Harun; Günay, Ünver (1997). Başlangıçtan Günümüze Türklerin Dinî Tarihi [The Religious History of Turks from the Past to the Present] (in Turkish). İstanbul.
- Halemba, Agnieszka (2003). "Contemporary Religious Life in the Republic of Altai: the Interaction of Buddhism and Shamanism" (PDF). Sibirica. 3 (2): 165–82. doi:10.1080/1361736042000245295. Archived from the original (PDF) on 10 May 2005.
- Heissig, Walther (1980) [1970]. The Religions of Mongolia. Translated by G. Samuel. London/Henley: Routledge; Kegan Paul. ISBN 0-7103-0685-7.
- Kafesoğlu, İbrahim (1980). Eski Türk Dini [Old Turkish Religion] (in Turkish). Ankara: Boğaziçi Yayınları.
- Khvastunova, Julia V. (2018). "Современное тенгрианство (на примере версии тенгрианства В. А. Сата в Республике Алтай)" [Modern Tengriism (as in V. A. Sat's Version of Tengriism in the Altai Republic)]. Colloquium Heptaploremes (in Russian) (5): 33–43.
- Klyashtornyj, Sergei G. (2008). Spinei, V. and C. (ed.). Old Turkic Runic Texts and History of the Eurasian Steppe. Bucureşti/Brăila: Editura Academiei Române; Editura Istros a Muzeului Brăilei.
- —— (2005). 'Political Background of the Old Turkic Religion' in: Oelschlägel, Nentwig, Taube (eds), "Roter Altai, gib dein Echo!" (FS Taube), Leipzig, pp. 260–65. ISBN 978-3-86583-062-3
- Kodar, Auezkhan (2009). "Тенгрианство в контексте монотеизма" [Tengriism in the context of monotheism]. Новые Исследования Тувы (in Russian) (1–2).
- Laruelle, Marlène (2007). "Religious Revival, Nationalism and the 'Invention of Tradition': Political Tengrism in Central Asia and Tatarstan". Central Asian Survey. 26 (2): 203–16. doi:10.1080/02634930701517433. S2CID 145234197.
- —— (22 March 2006). "Tengrism: In Search for Central Asia's Spiritual Roots" (PDF). Central Asia-Caucasus Analyst. 8 (6): 3–4. Archived from the original (PDF) on 7 December 2006.
- Moroz, Eugeny (2004). "От иудаизма к тенгрианству. Ещё раз о духовных поисках современных крымчаков и крымских караимов»" [From Judaism to Tengrism. Once again about the spiritual quest of the modern Krymchaks and Crimean Karaites]. Народ Книги В Мире Книг (in Russian) (52): 1–6.
- Ögel, Bahaeddin (2003) [1971]. Türk Mitolojisi (Kaynakları ve Açıklamaları ile Destanlar) [Turkish Mythology (Epics with Sources and Explanations)] (in Turkish) (4 ed.). Ankara: Türk Tarih Kurumu Yayınları.
- Pettazzoni, Raffaele (1956) [1955]. "Turco-Mongols and Related Peoples". The All-Knowing God. Researches into Early Religion and Culture. Translated by H. J. Rose. London.
- Poemer, H. R., ed. (2000). History of the Turkic Peoples in Pre-Islamic Period. Berlin: Klaus-Schwarz-Verlag. ISBN 9783879972838.
- Popov, Igor (2016). "Тюрко-монгольские религии (тенгрианство)" [Turko-Mongolic Religions (Tengrism)]. Справочник всех религиозных течений и объединений в России [The Reference Book on All Religious Branches and Communities in Russia] (in Russian).
- Richtsfeld, Bruno J. (2004). "Rezente ostmongolische Schöpfungs-, Ursprungs- und Weltkatastrophenerzählungen und ihre innerasiatischen Motiv- und Sujetparallelen" [Recent East Mongolian creation, origin, and world catastrophe narratives and their intra-Asian motif and subject parallels]. Münchner Beiträge zur Völkerkunde. Jahrbuch des Staatlichen Museums für Völkerkunde München [Munich Contributions to Ethnology. Yearbook of the State Museum of Ethnology Munich] (in German). Vol. 9. pp. 225–74.
- Róna-Tas, A. (1987). W. Heissig; H.-J. Klimkeit (eds.). "Materialien zur alten Religion den Turken: Synkretismus in den Religionen zentralasiens" [Materials on the ancient religion of the Turks: syncretism in the religions of Central Asia]. Studies in Oriental Religions (in German). 13. Wiesbaden: 33–45.
- Roux, Jean-Paul (2003) [2002]. Genghis Khan and the Mongol Empire. "Abrams Discoveries" series. Translated by Ballas, Toula. New York: Harry N. Abrams. ISBN 9780810991033.
- ——, ed. (1984). La religion des Turcs et des Mongols [The Religion of the Turks and Mongols] (in French). Paris: Payot.
- —— (1956). "Tängri. Essai sur le ciel-dieu des peuples altaïques" [Tängri. An Essay on the Deities of the Altaic Peoples]. Revue de l'histoire des religions (in French). Vol. 149 (149-1), pp. 49–82; Vol. 149 (149-2), pp. 197–230; Vol. 150 (150-1), pp. 27–54; Vol. 150 (150-2), pp. 173–212.
- ——. Tengri. In: Encyclopedia of Religion, Vol. 13, pp. 9080–82.
- Saraçoǧlu, Cenk (2004). Nihal Atsiz's World-view and Its Influences on the Shared Symbols, Rituals, Myths and Practices of the Ülkücü Movement. Universitäts- und Landesbibliothek Sachsen-Anhalt.
- Shimamura, Ippei (2014). The Roots Seekers: Shamamisn and Ethnicity Among the Mongol Buryats. Yokohama: Shumpusha. ISBN 978-4-86110-397-1.
- Shnirelman, Viktor A. (1996). Who Gets the Past?: Competition for Ancestors Among Non-Russian Intellectuals in Russia. Washington D.C., Baltimore & London: Woodrow Wilson Center Press; Johns Hopkins University Press. ISBN 978-0801852213.
- Stebleva, Irina V. (1971). "К реконструкции древнетюркской мифологической системы" [To the reconstruction of the ancient Turkic mythological system]. Тюркологический сборник [Turkological collection] (in Russian). Москва: АН СССР.
- Tanyu, Hikmet (1980). İslâmlıktan Önce Türkler'de Tek Tanrı İnancı [The Belief of Monotheism among Pre-Islamic Turks] (in Turkish). İstanbul.
- Tekin, Talât (1993). Irk Bitig = The Book of Omens. Turcologica, 18. Wiesbaden: Harrassowitz Verlag. ISBN 978-3-447-03426-5.
- The Secret History of the Mongols: a Mongolian Epic Chronicle of the Thirteenth Century. Inner Asian library. Vol. 1–2. Translated by Igor de Rachewiltz with a historical and philological commentary. Leiden: Brill. 2004 [1971–85]. ISBN 978-90-04-15363-9.
- Turner, Kevin (2016). Sky Shamans of Mongolia: Meetings with Remarkable Healers. Berkeley, Ca: North Atlantic Books. ISBN 9781583946343.
- Vovina, Olessia (2000). In Search of the National Idea: Cultural Revival and Traditional Religiosity in the Chuvash Republic (PDF). Seton Hall University. Archived from the original (PDF) on 14 December 2022.

=== Modern Tengrist authors ===
- Adji, Murad (2005) [1998]. Asia's Europa. Vol. 1: Europe, Turkic, the Great Steppe. Translated by A. Kisilev. Moscow: ACT.
- Adyg-Tulush, Kara-ool Dopchun-ool oglu (2019) [2014]. Мистические тувинцы — скифы, хунны, тюрки Уранхая. Мистические шаманские видения Верховного шамана Тувы и России [The Mystical Tuvans—Scythians, Huns, Turks of Urankhai. Mystical Shamanic Visions of the Supreme Shaman of Tuva and Russia] (in Tuvinian) (2nd rev. ed.). Кызыл.
- Afanasyev, Lazar A. (Téris) (1993). Айыы уорэҔэ [Teachings of Aiyy] (in Yakut). Якутск: Министерство культуры Республики Саха (Якутия).
- Akatai, Sabetkazy N. (2011) [1990]. Күн мен көлеңке: ғылыми-танымдық аңсар; Тарихи материалдар [The Sun and Shadow: Science and Education; Historical materials] (in Kazakh). Алматы: Print-Express. ISBN 978-601-7046-23-1.
- Atabek, Aron (2000). Йоллыг-Тегин. Памятник Куль-Тегина [Yollig Tegin. Kul Tegin Monument] (in Russian). Алматы: Кенже-пресс.
- Atsız, Hüseyin Nihâl (1966). Türk Tarihinde Meseleler [Problems in Turkish History] (in Turkish). Ankara: Afşın Yayınları.
- Ayupov, Nurmagambet G. (2012). Тенгрианство как открытое мировоззрение [Tengrism as an Open Worldview] (PDF) (in Russian). Алматы: КазНПУ им. Абая; КИЕ.
- Bezertinov, Rafael (2000). "Chapter 3. Deities / Trans. by N. Kisamov". Тенгрианство — религия тюрков и монголов [Tengrianizm: The Religion of the Turks and Mongols] (in Russian). Набережные Челны: Аяз. Archived from the original on 3 February 2006.
- Butanayev, Victor Y. (2003). Бурханизм тюрков Саяно-Алтая [Burkhanism of the Turks of Sayano-Altai] (in Russian). Абакан: Изд-во Хакасского государственного университета им. Н. Ф. Катанова. ISBN 5-7810-0226-X. Archived from the original on 26 June 2014.
- Devbash, Firdus (2011) [2009]. Татарские молитвы [Tatar Prayers] (in Russian) (2nd rev. ed.). Казань: ПФ "Гарт". ISBN 978-5-905372-03-2.
- Fyodorova, Lena V. (2012). Духовные основы евразийства. Культурно-цивилизационные аспекты [The Spiritual Foundations of Eurasianism. Cultural and Civilizational Aspects] (in Russian). Lambert Academic Publishing. ISBN 978-3-659-13666-5.
- Kenin-Lopsan, Mongush B. (1993). Магия тувинских шаманов = Magic of Tuvan Shamans (in Russian and English). Кызыл: Новости Тувы.
- Kenin-Lopsan, Mongush B. (2010) [2002]. Calling the Bear Spirit: Ancient Shamanic Invocations and Working Songs from Tuva. Kristianstad: Kjellin. ISBN 9789197831901.
- Kodar, Auezkhan (2005) [2002]. The Steppe Knowledge. Essays on Cultural Science. Translated by I. Poluyahtov. Almaty: Ассоциация "Золотой век".
- Omuraliyev, Choiun (1994). Теңирчилик: Улуттук философиянын уңусуна чалгын [Tengrism: National Philosophy] (in Kyrgyz). Бишкек: Крон.
- Omuraliyev, Choiun (2012). Теңирчилик: Коом-Мамлекет [Tengrism: Society–State] (in Kyrgyz). Бишкек: Кыргыз Жер. ISBN 978-9967-26-597-4.
- Sarygulov, Dastan (2002). Тенгрианство и глобальные проблемы современности [Tengrism and Global Problems of Modernity] (in Russian). Бишкек: Фонд Тенгир-Ордо. ISBN 9967-21-186-5.
- Shodoev, Nikolai A. (2010). Основы алтайской философии [Fundamentals of the Altaian Philosophy] (in Russian). Бийск.
- Stewart, Julie (3 October 1997). "A Course in Mongolian Shamanism—Introduction 101". Ulaanbaatar: Golomt Center for Shamanist Studies.
- Suleimenov, Olzhas O. (1975). АЗ и Я. Книга благонамеренного читателя [AZ-and-IA. Book of a well-meaning reader] (in Russian). Алма-Ата: Жазушы.
- Suleimenov, Olzhas O. (2002). Тюрки в доистории (о происхождении древнетюркских языков и письменностей) [The Turks in Prehistory (on the origin of the ancient Turkic languages and scripts)] (in Russian). Алматы: Атамұра. ISBN 9965-05-662-5.
- Trer, Yosif (2019). Хӗрӗх чалӑш хӗрлӗ ту [Forty Fathoms Red Mountain] (in Chuvash). Шупашкар: ÇИП.
- Tschinag, Galsan (2006) [1994]. The Blue Sky: A Novel. Translated by K. Rout. Minneapolis, Minn: Milkweed Editions. ISBN 978-1-571310-55-2. "."
- Tsyrendorzhiev, Bair Zh.; Dogbaeva-Rinchino, M. R. (2019). Тэнгэридэ шүтэлгэ. Элинсэг хулинсагаймнай уряа. "Угай хүндэ" гэжэ үргэл, заншал = Тэнгэрианство. Зов предков. Почитание рода [Tengrism. The Call of the Ancestors. Veneration of the Kind] (in Buriat and Russian). Улан-Удэ: Республиканская типография. ISBN 978-5-91407-189-6.
- Tyrysova, Zinaida T. (2008). Ургÿлjикти учугы — Алтай Jаҥ (Нить вечности — Алтай Jан) [Thread of Eternity—Altai Jang] (in Southern Altai). Горно-Алтайск.
- Urbanaeva, Irina S. (2000). Шаманская философия бурят-монголов: центральноазиатское тэнгрианство в свете духовных учений: в 2 ч. [Shamanistic Philosophy of the Buryat-Mongols: Central Asian Tengrism in the Light of Spiritual Teachings: In 2 parts] (in Russian). Улан-Удэ: БНЦ СО РАН. ISBN 5-7925-0024-X.
