= List of Tengrist movements =

Tengrism—the Turkic-Mongolic ethnic religion—may include both old folk traditions and neo-Tengrist movements, which try to reconstruct old native beliefs.

Movements are distributed according to their ethnicity with year of foundation.

== List ==
Altaian, Kumandin, and Teleut

- Altaian shamanism
  - Agaru Sang (Altay: Агару Саҥ — Sacral Altar) (1996)
    - Altaian center of Chemalsky district (Russian: "Алтайский центр" Чемальского района) (1999)
- Burkhanism/Ak Jang (Altay: Ак Јаҥ) (1904)
  - Altai Faith (Altay: Алтай-Jаҥ)
    - Sacral Altai public ecological organization (Russian: Общественная экологическая организация "Сакральный Алтай") (2016)
  - Altai Faith White Faith (Altay: Алтай-Јаҥ Ак Јаҥ (Јаҥы Алтай)) (2004)
  - Soul Ecology School "Tengri" (Russian: Школа экологии души "Тенгри") (1995)
  - Spiritual and Health center "Ak Sanaa" (Russian: Духовно-оздоровительный центр "Ак санаа")
  - Spiritual center of the Turks "Kin Altai" (Russian: Духовный центр тюрков "Кин Алтай") (2005)
  - Tengrism—Heavenly Faith (Russian: Тенгрианство — Небесная Вера) (2010)

Azerbaijani and Qashqai
Bashkir
Bonan
Buryat and Soyot

- Buryat folk religion spiritual center "BƟƟ Murgel" (Russian: Духовный центр бурятской народной религии "БƟƟ мургэл") (1991)
- Buryat Shamans' association "BƟƟ Murgel" (Russian: Ассоциация шаманов Бурятии "БƟƟ мургэл") (1991)
- Council of Shamanistic communities of the Baikal region (Russian: Совет шаманских общин Прибайкалья) (2008)
- Shamans' religion organization "Tengeri" (Russian: Религиозная организация шаманов "Тэнгэри") (2003)

Chulym
Chuvash

- Vattisen Yaly (Chuvash: Ваттисен йӑли)
  - Chuvash National Congress (Chuvash: Чӑваш наци конгресӗ) (1989–1992)
  - Chuvash Traditional Faith Organization "Tura" (Russian: Организация традиционной веры чувашей "Тура") (1995)
  - Fund for the Support of the Chuvash National Culture "Sawar" (Chuvash: "Сӑвар" чӑваш наци культурин аталану фонд) (2012)

Crimean Tatar

- Tengri Society

Daur

- Daur shamanism

Dolgan
Dongxiang
Dukhan

- Dukhan shamanism

Gagauz
Hamnigan
Kalmyk

- Center for the Development of Modern Oirat Culture "Tengrin Uidl" (Milky Way) Kalmyk public organization (Russian: Калмыцкая общественная организация "Центр развития современной ойратской культуры "Тенгрин уйдл" (Млечный путь)") (2010)

Kangjia
Karachay and Balkar
Karaim
Karakalpak
Kazakh

- Khaganate (Kazakh: Қағанат)
- World of the Great Steppe public association (Dalaruh) (Kazakh: Ұлы Дала Әлемі (Даларух); Russian: Мир Великой Степи (Даларух))

Khakas

- Khakas Heritage Center—the Society of Traditional Religion of Khakas Shamanism "Ah-Chayan" (Russian: Центр хакасского наследия — общество традиционной религии хакасского шаманизма "Ах-Чаян") (1994)
- Traditional religion of the Khakas people society "Izykh" (Russian: Общество традиционной религии хакасского народа "Изых")
- Traditional religion society "Khan Tigir" (Russian: Общество традиционной религии "Хан Тигир")

Khalaj
Khatso
Khorasani Turk
Khoton
Krymchak

- Crimean Society of Krymchaks "Krymchahlar" (Krymchak: Kърымчахлар) (1989)

Kumyk
Kyrgyz and Fuyu Kyrgyz

- Aigine (Kyrgyz: Айгине)
- Alty Yurt (Kyrgyz: Алты Юрт)
- Manas Ordo (Kyrgyz: Манас Ордо)
- Tengir Ordo (Kyrgyz: Теңир Ордо) (2005)
- Tengirchilik (Kyrgyz: Теңирчилик)

Moghol
Mongolian

- Mongolian shamanism/Tengerism (Mongolian: Бөө мөргөл/Тэнгэризм)
  - Heaven's Dagger
  - Mongolian Shamans' Association (Golomt Tuv)
    - Circle of Tengerism (Mongolian shamanic association of America)
    - Golomt Center for Shamanist Studies
  - Samgaldai Tengrist Center (Mongolian: Хаант Тэнгэрийн Самгалдай)

Monguor
Nogai
Salar
Shor
Siberian Tatar
Sichuan Mongol
Sogwo Arig
Tatar
Tofalar
Turkish
Turkmen
Tuvan

- Centralized religion shamanistic organization "The office of the Supreme Shaman of Tuva" (Russian: Централизованная религиозная шаманская организация Тувы "Управление Верховного Шамана")
- Charitable Fund of Support and Conservation of Shamanism "The Sun" ("Hun") (Russian: Благотворительный фонд поддержки и сохранения шаманизма "Солнце" ("Хун"))
- Shamans' religion organization "Adyg-Eeren" ("Spirit of the Bear") (Russian: Религиозная организация шаманов "Адыг-Ээрен — Дух Медведя")
- Shamans' religion organization "Tengri Uger" ("Heavenly Bull") (Russian: Религиозная организация шаманов "Тэнгри Угер" (Небесный бык))
- Shamans' religion organization "Tos-Deer" ("Nine Heavens") (Russian: Религиозная организация шаманов "Тос-Дээр" (Девять Небес)) (1998)
- Tuvan Shamans' religion organization "Dungur" ("Drum") (Russian: Организация тувинских шаманов "Дунгур" (Бубен)) (1991)

Uyghur, Äynu, and Ili Turk
Uzbek
Yakut (Sakha)

- Aar Aiyy Faith (Yakut: Аар Айыы итэҕэлэ, romanized: Aar Aiyy Iteghele) (1996)
- Aiyy Faith (Yakut: Айыы итэҕэлэ, romanized: Aiyy Iteghele), former Kut-Siur (1990)
- Aiyy Tangara Faith (Yakut: Айыы Таҥара итэҕэлэ, romanized: Aiyy Taŋara Iteghele) (2019)
- Iteghel (Faith) (Yakut: Итэҕэл (Вера), romanized: Iteghel (Vera)) (1995)
- White Aiyy Faith (Yakut: Yрүҥ Айыы итэҕэлэ, romanized: Ürüŋ Aiyy Iteghele)

Yugur
Non-Turko-Mongolic

- Tangra Warriors movement (Bulgarian: Движение "Воини на Тангра", romanized: Dvizhenie "Voini na Tangra")

Interethnic

- International Fund of Tengri Research (Russian: Международный Фонд Исследования Тенгри) (2011)

== See also ==
- List of Tengrist states and dynasties

== Bibliography ==
- Balogh, Matyas (2010). "Contemporary shamanisms in Mongolia". Asian Ethnicity. 11 (2): 229–38. doi:10.1080/14631361003779489. S2CID 145595446.
- Bourdeaux, Michael; Filatov, Sergey, eds. (2006). Современная религиозная жизнь России. Опыт систематического описания [Contemporary Religious Life of Russia. Systematic description experience] (in Russian). Vol. 4. Keston Institute. Москва: Logos. ISBN 5-98704-057-4.
- Bumochir, D. (2014). "Institutionalization of Mongolian shamanism: from primitivism to civilization". Asian Ethnicity. 15 (4): 473–91. doi:10.1080/14631369.2014.939331. S2CID 145329835.
- Dulov, Vladimir (2013). "Bulgarian Society and Diversity of Pagan and Neopagan Themes". In Kaarina Aitamurto; Scott Simpson (eds.). Modern Pagan and Native Faith Movements in Central and Eastern Europe. Durham: Acumen. pp. 195–212. ISBN 9781844656622.
- Filatov, Sergey; Shchipkov, Aleksandr (1995). "Religious Developments among the Volga Nations as a Model for the Russian Federation" (PDF). Religion, State & Society. 23 (3): 233–48. doi:10.1080/09637499508431705.
- Halemba, Agnieszka (2003). "Contemporary religious life in the Republic of Altai: the interaction of Buddhism and Shamanism" (PDF). Sibirica. 3 (2): 165–82. doi:10.1080/1361736042000245295. Archived from the original (PDF) on 2005-05-10.
- Humphrey, Caroline; Onon, Urgunge (1996). Shamans and Elders: Experience, Knowledge, and Power among the Daur Mongols. Oxford: Clarendon Press.
- Khvastunova, Julia V. (2018). "Современное тенгрианство (на примере версии тенгрианства В. А. Сата в Республике Алтай)" [Modern Tengriism (as in V. A. Sat's Version of Tengriism in the Altai Republic]. Colloquium Heptaploremes (in Russian) (5): 33–43.
- Knorre, Boris K. (2016). "Современный алтайский шаманизм в контексте национальной религиозной политики Республики Алтай" [Contemporary Altai Shamanism in the Context of the National Religious Policy of the Altai Republic]. Вестник РГГУ. Сер. Литературоведение. Языкознание. Культурология (in Russian). 21 (12): 89–114.
- Laruelle, Marlène (2007). "Religious revival, nationalism and the 'invention of tradition': political Tengrism in Central Asia and Tatarstan". Central Asian Survey. 26 (2): 203–16. doi:10.1080/02634930701517433. S2CID 145234197.
- Marat, Erica (2005-12-06). "High-Ranking Kyrgyz Official Proposes New National Ideology". Eurasia Daily Monitor. 2 (226). The Jamestown Foundation. Archived from the original on 2012-09-12.
- Popov, Igor (2016). "4.1 Тюрко-монгольские религии (тенгрианство)" [4.1 Turko-Mongolic Religions (Tengrism)]. Справочник всех религиозных течений и объединений в России [The Reference Book on All Religious Branches and Communities in Russia] (in Russian).
- Quijada, Jastine B.; Graber, Kathryn E.; Stephen, Eric (2015). "Finding "Their Own": Revitalizing Buryat Culture Through Shamanic Practices in Ulan-Ude". Problems of Post-Communism. 62 (5): 258–72. doi:10.1080/10758216.2015.1057040. S2CID 143106014.
- Schlehe, Judith (2004). "Shamanism in Mongolia and in New Age Movements". In Rasuly-Paleczek, Gabriele (ed.). Central Asia on Display: Proceedings of the VIIth Conference of the European Society for Central Asian Studies. Vol. 1. Vienna: LIT Verlag. pp. 283–96. ISBN 3-8258-8309-4.
- Shimamura, Ippei (2004). "Yellow Shamans (Mongolia)". In Walter, Mariko Namba; Neumann Fridman; Eva Jane (eds.). Shamanism: An Encyclopedia of World Beliefs, Practices, and Culture. Vol. 1. Santa Barbara, Ca: ABC-Clio. pp. 649–51. ISBN 9781576076453.
- Turner, Kevin (2016). Sky Shamans of Mongolia: Meetings with Remarkable Healers. Berkeley, Ca: North Atlantic Books. ISBN 9781583946343.
- Vovina, Olessia (2000). In Search of the National Idea: Cultural Revival and Traditional Religiosity in the Chuvash Republic (PDF). Seton Hall University. Archived from the original (PDF) on 2022-12-14.
