= Aiyy Faith =

Tengrist organization in Yakutsk, Russia

Aiyy Faith (Айыы итэҕэлэ)
- Formation: 2015 (11 years ago)
- Founder: Lazar Afanasyev (Téris)
- Type: Religious organisation
- Headquarters: Yakutsk, Sakha Republic (Yakutia)
- Region served: Sakha Republic (Yakutia)
- Main organ: Council Body
- Affiliations: Tengrism

The Aiyy Faith (Yakut: Айыы итэҕэлэ, romanized: Ayıı iteğele) is a neo-Tengrist Yakut religious organization that has been registered since 2015 in Yakutsk, Sakha Republic (Yakutia), Russia. It was established by the philologist Lazar "Téris" Afanasyev and has a precursor in the organization Kut-Siur, founded in 1990.

== History ==
The philologist Lazar Afanasyev (Russian: Лазарь Андреевич Афанасьев; 1952–2017), also known by his ethnic name "Téris", studied shamanism in the Soviet years. His teaching is a monotheistically modernized Yakut version of Tengrism and is set forth in the book Teachings of Aiyy. Afanasyev's organization Kut-Siur (Yakut: Кут-сүр — Heart-Soul-Mind) was founded in 1990 and established in 1993 in Yakutsk.

Kut-Siur collaborated closely with the Yakut national movement "The Future of the Yakuts" (Sakha Kaskile) led by Ivan Ukhkhan. Together they requested from the beginning of the 1990s permission to construct the temple: in 1999, by a decree of the republican authorities, the House of Purification (Archie Diete), a wood, glass and metal wonder composed in the form of three gigantic yurts, was laid down and opened in 2002. In 2001, the local Orthodox archbishop sharply criticized the construction of the "pagan temple" (kapishche). After the new President of Yakutia was elected in 2002, the pro-Orthodox course of the authorities began, and so representatives of ethnic religions ceased to be invited to inter-religious meetings. The House of Purification was taken away and transferred to the city, which turned it into a house of culture. Religious and political activists demand its return, as well as the "Three Birch" National Park promised by the authorities and a pagan school in Yakutsk. However, the authorities stopped trying to prevent the spread of Aiyy Faith at the grassroots level in the villages.

Afanasyev's new organization Aiyy Faith was registered in 2015 in Yakutsk, Sakha Republic (Yakutia), Russia.

== Teachings ==
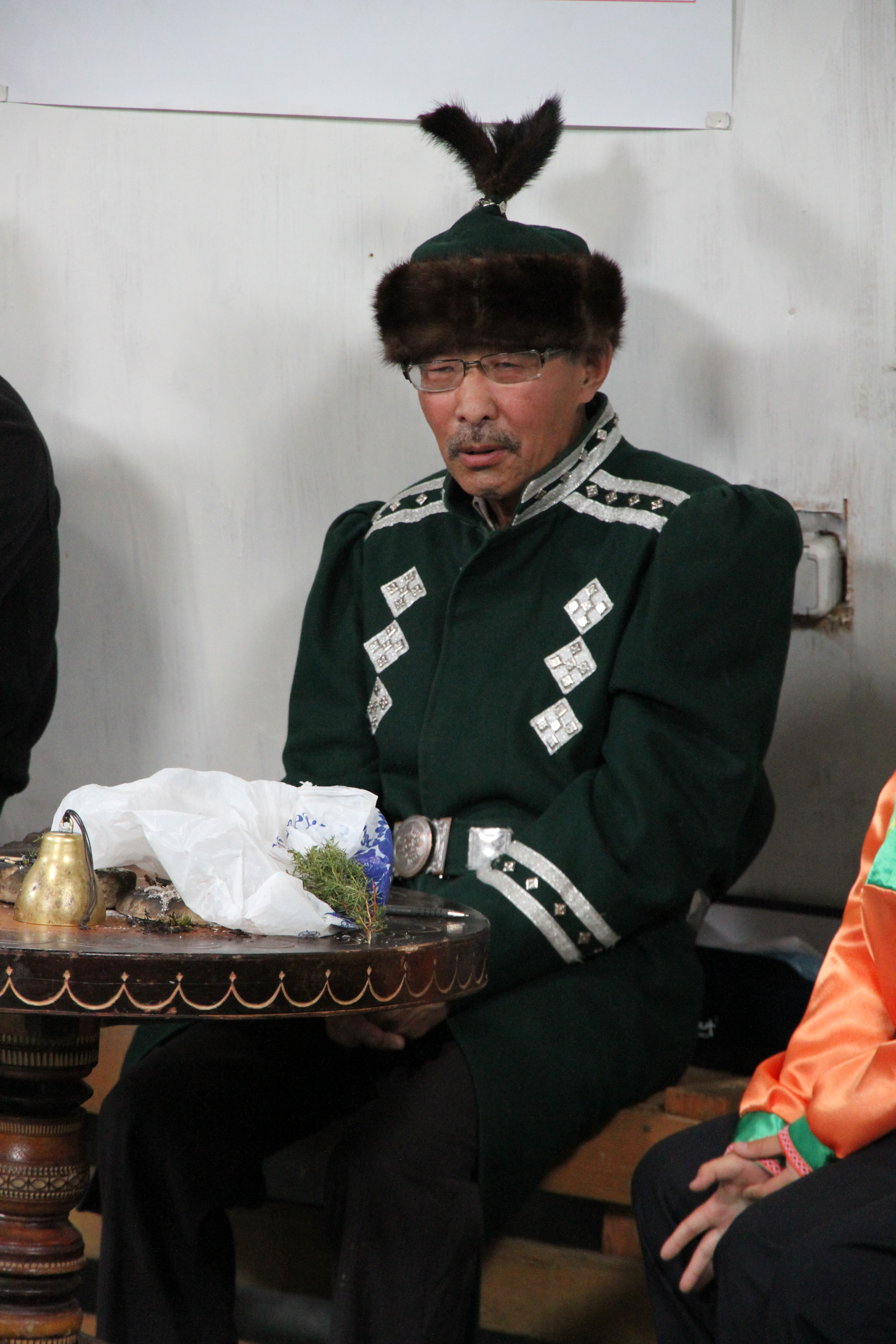
Lazar "Téris" Afanasyev in 2015

Aiyy (Tangra)—the Creator God—lives in the 9th Heaven. All the other 63 deities of the Yakut pantheon are his manifestations (compare avatars in Hinduism). "White shamans" serve him (while it is forbidden to turn to the "black shamans" of Yakut paganism). Man consists of three souls (Kut): the soul-earth, soul-air, and soul-mother, which return to Aiyy upon the physical body's death. When some traditionalists ask about the sources of this teaching, he replies that he received such teachings from a "white old spirit".

The main posts, or offices, of this organization are the Philosopher and the Toyon (Tribal chief). It has the Aiyy houses and urasas (birch-bark dwellings) in the villages in which common prayers and bloodless sacrifices with fermented mare's milk are performed. The doctrine influenced the content of teaching national culture in schools and especially on the training of personnel at the local College of Culture.

== See also ==
- Yakut shamanism
- List of Tengrist movements
- New religious movement
