= Abasy =

Demons in Sakha mythology

The Abaasy (Abaahy or Abasy, Yakut: Aбаасы, Abaası [abaːsɯ]; Dolgan: Абааһы, Abaahı; Bulgarian: Абааси, Abaasi; Russian: Абасы, Abasy; cognate of the Turkic word Abası; also Chebeldei) are demons in the mythology of the Sakha (also known as the Yakuts). Yakut shamanism divides the universe into upper and lower layers, with the earth being "a kind of indeterminate space or matter" in between. The abaasy occupy the lower level, referred to as the underworld or "kingdom of darkness."

The abaasy are alleged to be the spirits of the long deceased, who dwell near graves or in deserted places, or who otherwise travel about causing destruction. They serve Arson-Duolai, the ruler of the dead, who also swallows people's souls and gives the living diseases. The abaasy can be appeased by blood sacrifices.

The abaasy have been depicted as causing sexual manifestations and madness.

== Description ==
The abbasy are described as "one-eyed, one-armed, one-legged" monsters mounted on "two-headed, eight-legged, two-tailed dragons as steeds." In the Olonkho epic poems they are ugly and horrible man-eating beings. Their chief Alyp Khara Aat Mogoidoon is a three-headed, six-armed and six-legged giant with a body made of iron.

== Cultural significance ==
The concept of the abaasy is so ingrained into Sakha thought that the verb абааһы көр- (to see abaasy) is the everyday term for "to hate" or "to dislike".

== See also ==
- Aiy
