= Tengir Ordo =

Tengrist movement in Kyrgyzstan

The Tengir Ordo (Kyrgyz: Теңир Ордо — Tengri's Orda) is a Tengrist neopagan religious movement established in 2005 in Bishkek, Kyrgyzstan with International Scientific Center of Tengrist Studies, but already previously incorporated as Tengir-Ordo Association for the Preservation of the National Heritage that in 2003 in Bishkek held the first international scientific symposium on Tengrism "Tengrism—the worldview of the Altaic peoples".

Its founder is Dastan Sarygulov, an active promoter of Tengrism, has authored a book on Tengrism, and in 2005–2006 was the state secretary and chair of special state working group dealing with ideological issues. The movement was inspired by the ideas of one of the first ideologists of pre-Islamic religion in the post-Soviet space, the Kyrgyz writer Choiun Omuraliev alias Choiun uulu Omuraly, described in his book "Tengrism” (1994). D. Sarygulov interprets Tengrism as the native religion of the Kyrgyz and being an optimal way to promote an anti-capitalist lifestyle and a natural response to globalization processes.

Tengir Ordo aims to promote the values and traditions of the Tengrist period of Kyrgyzstan and spread pre-Islamic cultures among the Central Asian Turks for making them closer together again.

It publishes a Tengrist calendar.

== See also ==
- List of Tengrist movements

== Primary sources ==
- Sarygulov, Dastan (2002). Тенгрианство и глобальные проблемы современности [Tengrism and Global Problems of Modernity] (in Russian). Бишкек: Фонд Тенгир-Ордо. ISBN 9967-21-186-5.
