= Dastan Sarygulov =

Kyrgyzstani businessman and politician

Dastan Islamovich Sarygulov (Kyrgyz: Дастан Ислам уулу Сарыгулов, romanized: Dastan Islam uulu Sarygulov, born 1947) is a Kyrgyz businessman and politician.

After graduating as an engineer in 1970, he made a career in the Kirghiz Soviet Socialist Republic in the 1970s to 1980s. A protégé of the first Kyrgyz president, Askar Akayev, he was given the position of governor of Talas in 1991–1992, and president of Kyrgyzaltyn, a state company that oversees Kyrgyz gold production, from 1992 to 1999.

When Akaev was ousted by the Tulip Revolution, Sarygulov managed to secure the position of state secretary in the cabinet of president Kurmanbek Bakiyev, formed after the 2005 election, but was forced to step down under president in May 2006. During his time in office, he also chaired an ideological committee where he proposed the adoption of "Tengrism" as an ethnocentric Kyrgyz national ideology. His ideology is an anti-capitalist one.

In 2016, he was arrested along with eight other politicians on suspicion of attempting to seize power. According to Eurasia.net, the existence of the coup plot "has elicited much skepticism." The Kyrgyz government has alleged that he perpetrated serious fraud and embezzlement while he headed Kyrgyzaltyn. Sarygulov is an opposition politician in Kyrgyzstan.
