= Mongush Kenin-Lopsan =

Russian writer and poet (1925–2022)

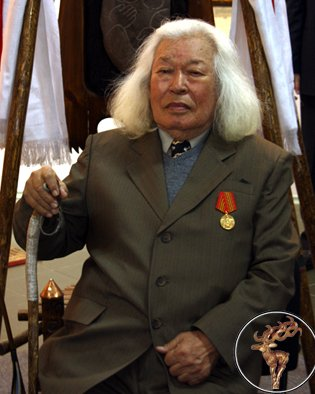
Kenin-Lopsan in 2010

Mongush Borakhovitch Kenin-Lopsan (Russian: Монгуш Борахович Кенин-Лопсан, Tuvan: Моңгуш Бора-Хөө оглу Кенин-Лопсаң, romanized: Moñguş Bora-Xöö oglu Kenin-Lopsañ; 10 April 1925 – 10 February 2022) was a Russian writer, poet, historian, archaeologist, famous Tuvan shamanism researcher, and leader who lived in Kyzyl, the capital of Tuva, Russian Federation.

== Life ==
Kenin-Lopsan was born on 10 April 1925, at Chash-Tal, Tuva, Chöön-Khemtchik district to a family of Bora-Khöö. His grandparents/parents were nomads, cattle breeders, herders, blacksmiths as well as storytellers and shamans. Kenin-Lopsan was educated at ground school in Chadan, later on colleges in Kyzyl. He studied philology at Leningrad (today St. Petersburg) University and received a master's degree in 'Eastern Sciences'. Being back in Tuva, he served as a teacher of Tuvan as well as of Russian language and literature besides working as an editor for a publishing company in Tuva.

Among his first books was The Big Way (1956) as well as other novels like The Currents of the Big River (1965), Dance of Capricorn and The Yurt of the Horse Herder. He won several Russian and Tuvan prizes. Throughout his whole life, he collected stories from his kinsmen, storytellers, shamans, workers, herders and poets. For his research on shamanism, he was persecuted during Soviet times. His grandmother shamaness Kuular Khandyshap died after being imprisoned by Gulag for 15 years.

Kenin-Lopsan died on 10 February 2022, at the age of 96.

== Publications ==
- Algyshi Tuvinskich Shamanov (Songs of Tuvan Shamans), Novosti, Kyzyl 1995. - Schamanengesänge aus Tuva (translation into German), Lamuv, Göttingen 2013.
- Mifi Tuvinskich Shamanov (Stories of Tuvan Shamans), Novosti, Kyzyl 2002. - Calling the Bear Spirit (translation into English), Kjellin, Kristianstad 2010. - Schamanengeschichten aus Tuwa (Translation into German), Lamuv, Göttingen 2011.
- Hoppál, Mihaly (ed.): Shamanic Songs and Myths of Tuva (selected stories and songs out of "Algyshi" and "Mifi", English), Istor Books #7, Budapest 1997.
