= Jean-Paul Roux =

French historian and Turkologist (1925–2009)

- Born: 5 January 1925; Paris, France
- Died: 29 June 2009 (aged 84); Saint-Germain-en-Laye, France
- Education: École du Louvre; University of Paris; École pratique des hautes études Institut national des langues et civilisations orientales
- Occupations: Anthropologist, ethnologist, historian, historian of religion, Turkologist

Jean-Paul Roux, PhD (5 January 1925 – 29 June 2009) was a French Turkologist, and a specialist in Islamic culture.

He was a graduate of the Institut national des langues et civilisations orientales, the École du Louvre, and the École Pratique des Hautes Études. In 1966 he was awarded a doctorate in literature in Paris. He was director of research at CNRS from 1957 to 1970, the Science Secretary for the Department of Oriental Languages and Civilizations from 1960 to 1966, and a teacher of Islamic art at the École du Louvre. He was General Commissioner for the Islamic Arts at the Orangerie de Tuileries in 1971 and also at the Grand Palais in 1977. Jean-Paul Roux's Genghis Khan and the Mongol Empire (2003) has been described as an "admirable short introduction" by historian David Morgan.

Jean Paul Roux’s works encompass subjects such as Islam and Islamic Art, Turkish and Mongol History, the History of Religions, Mythologies, and Symbols. The Turkish government honored him with the State Award in 1973. In 1998, he was also awarded the TÜTAV Prize and the Liakat Medal.

== Publications ==
- Gengis Khan et l'Empire mongol, collection « Découvertes Gallimard » (nº 422), série Histoire. Paris: Éditions Gallimard (2002)
  - US edition – Genghis Khan and the Mongol Empire, "Abrams Discoveries" series. New York: Harry N. Abrams (2003)
  - UK edition – Genghis Khan and the Mongol Empire, 'New Horizons' series. London: Thames & Hudson (2003)
- Montagnes sacrées, montagnes mythiques (1999)
- L'Asie centrale, histoire et civilisation (1997) ISBN 978-2-213-59894-9
- Le roi, mythes et symbole (1995)
- Histoire de l'empire mongol (1993)
- Tamerlan (1991)
- Jésus (1989)
- Le sang. Mythes, symboles et réalités (1988)
- Babur, histoire des Grands Moghols (1986)
- Histoire des Turcs (1984)
- Les explorateurs au Moyen Âge [Explorers in the Middle Ages]. Temps qui court (in French). Vol. 25. Paris: Éditions du Seuil. 1961. OCLC 10058113. 191 pages. Largely re-written and published as Roux, Jean-Paul; Roux, Sylvie-Anne (5 February 1985). Les explorateurs au Moyen Âge [Explorers in the Middle Ages] (in French) (New ed.). Paris: Fayard. ISBN 978-2-213-01591-0. OCLC 12591151. 351 pages
- La Religion des Turcs et des Mongols (1984)
- Mustafa Kemal et la Turquie nouvelle (1983)
- Les traditions des nomades de la Turquie méridionale : contribution à l'étude des représentations religieuses des sociétés turques d'après les enquêtes effectuées chez les Yörük et les Tahtaci (1969)
- Faune et flore sacrées dans les sociétés altaïques (1966)
- La mort (la survie) chez les peuples altaïques anciens et médiévaux d'après les documents écrits (1963)
- In addition, between 1996 and 2003, he wrote numerous articles on Islam and Turkish history—particularly Ottoman history—on the website www.clio.fr. Among these writings are topics such as Istanbul, Ottoman miniature art, the relations between the Golden Horde and Russia, the Great Seljuks, and the Karakhanids.
