= Yakut shamanism =

Folk religion practiced by the Yakuts

Yakut shamanism is a folk religion traditionally practiced by the Yakuts. Accounts of the supernatural have been preserved in the olonkho, a musical folklore tradition. After the Russian conquest of the Yakut homeland in the 17th century some influences from Orthodox Christianity began. During the Soviet Union adherents were persecuted and the faith had to be practiced in secret. After the establishment of the Russian Federation came revivalist movements like the Aiyy Faith. Aspects of Yakut shamanism and Central Asian Buddhism have been promoted by the Sakha, like the Yhyakh festival.

== Legendary progenitors ==
Oral histories from the Yakut state their first ancestors were Omogoy Baai (Yakut: Омоҕой Баай, romanized: Omoğoy Baay) and Ellei Bootur (Yakut: Эллэй Боотур, romanized: Elley Bootur). The first complete account was written by a member of the Great Northern Expedition, Lindenau, during the mid-18th century. He stated that both men lived on the upper Lena and their descendant Toyon Badzhey later moved to the middle Lena. This version stands out compared to written recordings made a century afterward, where Omogoy and Ellei themselves migrate to the Middle Lena. This change could have occurred due to "the process of developing ethnic self-consciousness" from Yakut inhabitation of the Middle Lena where "the ancient version was rethought accordingly."

In later accounts Omogoy Baai traveled to Tuymaada Valley of the Middle Lena in the vicinity of modern Yakutsk upon the advice of a shaman. Once there the gods Ieyehsit (Yakut: Иэйиэхсит, romanized: İeyiexsit) and Aiyyhyt (Yakut: Айыыһыт, romanized: Ayııhıt) assisted him in locating a mare and a pregnant cow, which is seen as a folk memory of livestock domestication. The epithet "baai" (lit. "rich man") characterizes Omogoy as the materially affluent patriarch head of his clan. The homestead Omogoi created was an earthen hut without a stove or chimney. Further, it is claimed that he and his relatives were unaware of blacksmithing or spiritually potent music.

Ellei is seen by scholars as a cultural progenitor of the Yakut. Where he came from ranges in stories from not being specified, around Lake Baikal, or the lands of either the Urankhay, Mongols, or Tatars. This variety potentially arose from the cultural diversity of Lake Baikal tribes that later became ancestors of the Yakut. Arriving at the Middle Lena, Ellei became a slave of Omogoy and later married one of his daughters. Angry at this development Omogoy evicted his daughter and Ellei but gave them a single horse and cow. Despite the rift the two families cooperated on joint hunting excursions. Skilled as a blacksmith and carpenter, Ellei constructed a homestead with a window, door, stove, and chimney. He also built animal pens and shelters for his livestock.

Ellei later created the spring kumis festival Yhyakh, a holiday still celebrated by the Yakut. Omogoy was reluctant to attend the new event but eventually arrived. Ellei's eldest son presided as a shaman and after holding a blessing for the ceremony he arose to heaven. While accounts vary, Omogoy is usually stated to have offended the patron deities of Yhyakh and was killed by them.

== Uluu Khoro ==
In Khoro Yakut folklore neither Omogoy nor Ellei is an ancestral predecessor. Instead their progenitor is an old man that rode a bull, Uluu Khoro (Yakut: Улуу Хоро, romanized: Uluu Xoro). The Khoro people left their reportedly warm homeland and followed Uluu Khoro north through the Lena Plateau, where he named the Amga and Tatta Rivers. Upon reaching the alas Myuryu near the Middle Lena the Khorolors celebrated Yhyakh. During festivities their encampment was attacked with fire arrows by a local inhabitant. The Khorolors fled across the Lena and settled on the western bank there for several generations until Tygyn evicted them. In consequence the Khorolors moved into present-day Verkhnevilyuysky and Suntarsky Districts, with Khoro eventually named after them.

== Bibliography ==
=== Books ===
- Alekseev, N. A.; Emelyanov, N. V.; Petrov, V. T., eds. (2005). В этом разделе публикуются материалы по книге "Предания, легенды и мифы саха (якутов)" [Traditions, legends and myths of Sakha] (in Russian). Novosibirsk: Nauka. pp. 12–16. ISBN 5-02-030901-X.
- Lindenau, Jacob Johan (1983). Описание народов Сибири (первая половина XVIII века): Историко-этнографические материалы о народах Сибири и Северо-Востока [Description of the Peoples of Siberia (First Half of the Eighteenth Century): Historical and Ethnographical Materials on the Peoples of Siberia and North-East]. Дальневосточная историческая библиотека (in Russian). Translated by Titova, Z. D. Magadan: Magadan.
- Okladnikov, A. P. (1955). Якутия до присоединения к русскому государству [Yakutia before joining Russia] (in Russian). Vol. 1. Moscow, Leningrad: yes.
- Okladnikov, Alexey Pavlovich (1970). Michael, Henry N. (ed.). Yakutia: Before its incorporation into the Russian State. Anthropology of the North: Translations from Russian Sources. Montreal & London: McGill-Queen's University Press. ISBN 978-0-7735-9068-7.
