= Ippei Shimamura =

Japanese anthropologist (born 1969)

Ippei Shimamura (島村 一平, Shimamura Ippei; born in 1969) is a Japanese anthropologist who is best known for his ethnographic work on shamanism and ethnic identity among Mongol Buryats, which has won multiple awards. Currently he is a Professor of Cultural Anthropology and Mongolian Studies in the National Museum of Ethnology (a.k.a. Minpaku) in Osaka. Working for 15 years in the School of Human Cultures at the University of Shiga Prefecture in Hikone, he joined the Minpaku on April 1, 2020. Between April 2004 and September 2005 he was a research fellow at the National Museum of Ethnology in Osaka, and between October 2011 and March 2012 he was a visiting scholar at Mongolia and Inner Asian Studies Unit in the Department of Social Anthropology at the University of Cambridge in the UK. Shimamura originally studied law at Waseda University (1988-1993), but after visiting Mongolia with a film crew he decided to return to that country in 1995 and began his studies as an anthropologist. He completed a master's degree in Ethnology at the National University of Mongolia in Ulaanbaatar in 1998, being the first person from Japan to do so. Returning to Japan after living in Mongolia for 6 years, Shimamura achieved his Ph.D. in March 2004 at The Graduate University for Advanced Studies (SOKENDAI) in Hayama in Kanagawa Prefecture. His dissertation research was later published as a book, first in Japanese (in 2011) and later in English under the title The Roots Seekers: Shamanism and Ethnicity Among the Mongol Buryats (2014).

Shimamura's book, and the ethnographic research it was based upon, has earned him four major national awards in Japan. In November 2013 he won the Japan Consortium for Area Studies (JCAS)Award. In February 2014 it was announced that he had won a JSPS Prize from the Japan Society for the Promotion of Science. In October 2014 he was also awarded with the Daido Life Encouragement Prize for Area Studies from the Daido Life Foundation. In April 2016 he received the SOKENDAI Scientist Award from his alma mater, the Graduate University for Advanced Studies.
