= Aleksandr Shchipkov (social scientist) =

Russian sociologist of religion

- Aleksandr Vladimirovich Shchipkov
- Born: 3 August 1957 (age 69); Leningrad, USSR
- Citizenship: Russia
- Education: Doctor of Philosophy
- Known for: Sociologist of religion
- Scientific career
- Fields: Philosophy; Political science Religious studies Sociology of religion
- Website: shchipkov.net

Aleksandr Vladimirovich Shchipkov (Russian: Александр Владимирович Щипков; born 3 August 1957, Leningrad, USSR) is a Russian political scientist, sociologist of religion, specialist in church-state relationships, doctor of political science, professor of the Faculty of Philosophy of Moscow State University, editor-in-chief of RELIGARE.RU Internet magazine.

Advisor to the Chairperson of the Russian State Duma; member of the Civic Chamber of the Russian Federation, the First Deputy Chairperson of the Synodal Department of the Moscow Patriarchate for relations with Society and the Media.

== Biography ==
In the 1970s and 80s Shchipkov was active in the Orthodox underground resistance and was eventually prosecuted. Shchipkov was expelled from the institute for his religious beliefs and joined the army. Working as a factory worker in Smolensk and Leningrad until 1991. His first works were published and distributed via samizdat. After 1991, Shchipkov worked in newspapers, radio and television of Saint Petersburg and Moscow. He also taught the sociology of religion and was engaged in scientific research.

After 1991, Shchipkov worked in newspapers, radio and television of Saint Petersburg and Moscow. He also taught the sociology of religion and was engaged in scientific research.

Shchipkov's life and works were heavily influenced by his stay in the community of Orthodox dissidents and the fate of his mother, Tatiana Shchipkova, who was sentenced to three years in Soviet labour camps (1980–83) for her orthodox views.

Aleksandr Shchipkov is a representative of the nonsystem part of the former dissident community. Despite his negative outlook towards the communist state, Shchipkov considers the Soviet period as non-uniform. While openly criticizing the Communist monopoly on ideology (ex. official “Gosateizm” – state atheism), he believes that the Soviet forms of sociality correlate with the traditions of Russian Social Orthodoxy (community collectivism).

Shchipkov considers the attitude to the Russian church tradition and Russian Orthodox Church (ROC) as an important milestone in relation to the assessment of the Russian political scene during the 1990s. In a number of articles and interviews, he argues that post-Soviet authorities used Orthodoxy as an "anti-Soviet marker", although these same instigators were not ready to return the Church's historical rights - for example, the law to return Church property, including temples, was adopted only in 2010.

In 2000, Shchipkov, under the supervision of Academy of Sciences member Lev Mitrokhin, defended his social philosophy PhD thesis on “Christian-democratic movements in post-Soviet Russia” at the Institute of Philosophy at Academy of Sciences. In his dissertation, Shchipkov admitted that prospects of Christian democracy in Russia were not too promising. Around the same time, Shchipkov became deputy chairman of the Methodical Council, which covers religious themes in the media at the Federal Ministry of Press and Mass Communication. He has acted as Chairman of the Guild of religious journalism since 2001 and as Chairman of the Club of Orthodox Journalists since 2007. Since 2002, he has held the rank of the editor-in-chief of the Internet magazine "religare.ru". Shchipkov has been a mainstay of modern Russian religious journalism from its origins, to which he dedicated the book The Religious Layer of Journalism.

Near the end of the 1990s and early 2000s, Shchipkov began to study the phenomenon of Russian religiosity, traditional and new religious movements, Russian religious consciousness and its intersection with political ideologies. At the same time, he noted the social aspects of Russian Orthodoxy, internal church issues, and life of the Orthodox community. Starting in the 2010s, Shchipkov has studied the trend of post-secularity as a global phenomenon.

== Scientific and social activities ==
In some of his articles, Shchipkov rejects the idea of a secular reformation of the church and criticizes the liberal claims to reform the church in alignment to a new post-Protestant secularism.

Shchipkov criticizes the ideology of church (not state) secularization, considering it as a quasi-religious phenomenon rather than a secular one, which fits for the concept of contemporary post-secular (hybrid) community.

Shchipkov asserts that liberal atheistic and quasi-Orthodox intellectuals, whose influence came down after 2010, led to the break with the Russian Orthodox Church (ROC) and started an information war with it. This situation became apparent in 2012, when the Russian Orthodox Church hierarchy refused to support an attempt of Russian "Maidan" - a "Bolotnaya revolution", which, according to Shchipkov, aimed to return to power the Russian elite of the 90s.

Shchipkov analyzed a series of antireligious events in Russian media in 2012 in his book "The Territory of the Church". The apogee of this information attack on the Russian Orthodox Church culminated with the performance of Pussy Riot at the Cathedral of Christ the Savior. Shchipkov called this action "a cold act of terrorism".

Shchipkov mainly spent the 2000s-10s examining church-state relations. The growth of Orthodox civic consciousness is largely associated with the struggle for the construction of churches in Moscow in accordance with the "200 Churches" program. The appearance of this movement was greatly promoted by informational and human rights center "Territory of the Church," organized by Shchipkov in 2012. At the same time, in the oldest Orthodox internet resource Religare.ru, the section "Territory of the Church" appeared along with team of journalists associated with it, dealing with the informational protection of "200 Churches" program. Subsequently, a social movement in support of the “200 Churches" program was born.

A combination of an academic research and active social activity is typical for Shchipkov. Shchipkov has also written about the transformation of the Russian political and ideological space after 2012, including the crisis of the liberal-comprador system of values and its inevitable transformation. Shchipkov covered this trend in his compilation "Perelom" (Fracture) in which seven well-known Russian writers contributions were continued in the vein of the famous pre-revolutionary book Vekhi (Milestones). Archaism, the crisis of modern liberalism, and the inevitable change of the ideological paradigm in Russia are themes the seven writers cover in Fracture. From the latter point, Shchipkov and most of his collaborators developed the concept of social conservatism (left-wing conservatism). This concept implies a "break of traditions" and the political transition of Russia from a model of dependence to a model of development.

Fracture has received extensive coverage and provoked debate both in Russia and abroad.

According to Shchipkov, the concept of social conservatism exists as a secular analogue of Christian orthodoxy (not exclusive to Russia), and, among other things, relates to the provisions of Basic Social Concept of the Russian Orthodox Church (adopted in 2000). Shchipkov believes (in accordance with the well-known structural matrix of Max Weber's formula) the central concept of the Russian tradition and Russian identity is "Orthodox ethics and the spirit of solidarity", i.e. where the social state and a just society, in his opinion, should be built on the basis of evangelical moral values. In his opinion, this model is reinforced by logic and conclusions of historical-economic analysis in the spirit of the school of world-systems analysis (I. Wallerstein, S. Amin et al.)

Shchipkov looks at social conservatism as both a piece of Russian history and a challenge in contemporary history. The change of the political situation in 2014 and the massive information and economic pressure on Russia has been an influence on the themes of Shchipkov's books. Shchipkov believes the challenge of protecting Russian Orthodoxy as a component of Russian identity should be a wider human rights project to combat Russophobia in Russia, which has led to the launch of World Russian People's Council, headed by Patriarch Kirill. Among other things, Shchipkov speaks of the need to strengthen national identity, protect national symbols and counteract against Russian genocide in Ukraine, which he believes is reminiscent of the ethnic war that was fought against the Russian people in 1941–45. Shchipkov has covered these themes in his book "National History as a Social Contract from Economic Hegemony to the Consensus Tradition".

Shchipkov has written a series of analytical articles exploring the liberal-capitalist origins of modern neo-fascism. Shipkov outlined his ideas in the book "Traditionalism, Liberalism and Neo-Nazism in the Current Political Space" (2015) translated into English. This book was widely seen as a warning about the dangers associated not only with the resuscitation of fascism in world politics, but also of fascization of the Russian elite and the Russian "creative class."

In addition to church-state relations and social and political trends, Shchipkov writes about the role of culture in social processes. In particular, he debates that the Bronze Age of Russian poetry will determine the future of Russian culture. Shchipkov also touches on the concept of aksiomodern - a state of a society combining a sense of "modern", "new time" (i.e. in the vein of Art Nouveau), universalism, united views of the world, and traditional moral values. This phenomenon is discussed in the book The Bronze Age in Russia. Outlook from Tarusa.

== Awards ==
Aleksandr Shchipkov is a member of the Union of Writers of Russia; member of the Inter-Council Presence of the Russian Orthodox Church; member of the Bureau of the Presidium of the World Russian People's Council; member of Russian Public Television (OTP).

He was awarded the Order of the Russian Orthodox Church of Daniil of Moscow, Third Degree (2007); Sergius of Radonezh, Third Degree (2013); Medal "In Memory of the 1000 anniversary of the passing away of Prince Vladimir Equal to the Apostles" (2015).

Laureate of the Russian Union of Journalists' "Golden Pen" (nominated for "Best Radio Program"); 1997.

Winner of the literary prize - Moscow magazine (nominated for "Publicism"); 2013.

Honorary Citizen of Tarusa. The title was awarded by the Tarusa City Duma on 21 May 2015 "for special contributions to Tarusa and invaluable contribution to the creation of the historical image of the city" (installation of monuments to Professor Ivan Tsvetaev, General Mikhail Efremov, poet Nikolay Zabolotsky).

== Personal life ==
Shchipkov lives in Tarusa, Russia. He is married and has four sons and grandsons.

== Books and articles ==
Author of the following books:

Shchipkov А. V. (editor and compiler). Paganism in Petersburg. Collection of Articles. — St.P.: Apostolskiy Gorod, 1999. — ISBN 5-93112-005-X.

Shchipkov А. V. What Russia believes. Religious Processes in Post-Perestroika Russia. — St.P.:Russian Christian Humanitarian Academy, 1998. — The ISBN printed in the publication (5-888-031-6) is invalid.

Shchipkov А. V. Cathedral Courtyard: Op-ed Pieces: 1991—2001. — М.: PROBEL-2000, 2003. — ISBN 5-901-683-64-1.

Shchipkov А. V.Christian Democracy in Russia. — М.: Kluch — С, 2004. — The ISBN printed in the publication (5-93136-029-3) is invalid.

Shchipkov А. V. The territory of the Church. — М.: INDRIK, 2012. — ISBN 978-5-91674-220-6.

Shchipkov А. V. (editor and compiler). Fracture. Collection of Articles on the Justice of Traditions. — М.: Probel-2000, 2013. — ISBN 978-5-98604-382-1.

Shchipkov А. V. The Religious Layer of Journalism. — М.: PROBEL-2000, 2014. — ISBN 978-5-98604-436-1.

Shchipkov А. V. Traditionalism, Liberalism and Neo-Nazism in the Current Political Space. — St.P.: Aleteya, 2015. — ISBN 978-5-9905927-1-1.

Shchipkov А. V. National History as a Social Contract, from Economic Hegemonism to Consensus of Tradition. – St.P.: Aleteya, 2015. — ISBN 978-5-906792-00-6.

Shchipkov А. V. Economic and Religious-Ethical Dialectics in the Establishment of Russian Social Traditionalism. — М.: Probel-2000, 2015. — ISBN 978-5-98604-493-4

Shchipkov A.V. The Bronze Age in Russia. Outlook from Tarusa. — Saint Petersburg: Russian Culture, 2015. — ISBN 978-5-905618-08-6

Shchipkov A.V. A View of the Future and the Social Tradition. — Telospress.com : Telos Press Publishing. 2017.
