= Aiy =

Benevolent spirits in Yakut mythology

Aiy (Sakha: Айыы, Ayıı) are benevolent spirits in Yakut mythology. They are creators of the world and of the fabulous land of the Yakut Olonkhos. In Sakha belief Urung Ai Toyon, creator of the world, is the greatest of them. According to mythology, the Aiy live in the Upper World. It is believed that the Aiy will not accept blood sacrifice and therefore they are presented "victims" of vegetable and dairy products.

Aiy symbols are required for the Ysyakh (spring feast) and regulated by the government of the Sakha Republic.

== See also ==
- Abasy
