= The Children of Clay =

2024 video game

- Developer: Balazs Ronyai
- Publisher: Balazs Ronyai
- Platforms: Windows, Linux
- Release: 21 October 2024
- Genres: Point-and-click, Horror game
- Mode: Single-player

The Children of Clay is a 2024 point-and-click horror game by Messier, the pseudonym of independent developer Balazs Ronyai. The game is a puzzle-based horror title in which the player inspects a cursed ancient artifact animated in stop motion. Upon release, The Children of Clay received a positive reception, with critics praising the game's atmosphere and visual presentation. A Steam version of the game was released in 2025.

== Gameplay ==
The statue in The Children of Clay was animated using stop motion animation.

The player's goal is to learn the artifact's origin and purpose, which is done by examining it and using the books to study relevant articles by keywords. Using point and click controls, players can rotate the sculpture with the mouse, and inspect it with a magnifying glass. A book to the left of the statue contains words that allow the player to identify more information about the statue by searching for keywords.

== Plot ==
Players assume the role of an archaeologist investigating an artifact on a desk, depicted in stop-motion animation, obtained from a colleague with a letter expressing remorse for an accident in the cave the artifact was located. The artifact, named Artifact 297, is a mysterious statue with a face discovered in the Ural Mountains. Examining the artifact reveals to the player that it is made of cold iron, hinting at warding against evil spirits, and contains old Hungarian script, translated as Ördög. Studying myths about Ördög, the player learns of a legend about Táltos who imprisoned the spawn of Ördög, and identifies the creature from the myth as mumus, a dark bogeyman that takes the form of the human's worst fear. Correctly identifying all of the artifact's backstory entries causes it to leak black liquid, and removing a nail in the statue releases the creature, depicted as a black shapeless mass. Upon discovering the creature, the player finds themselves transported in the darkness to a cave with no way out. The epilogue tells about the disappearance of the player's character and the discovery of a new burial site with several identical statues, now passed to universities for further study.

== Development and release ==
The game was developed by independent developer Balazs Ronyai over several days for the SCREAM JAM and Cosmic Horrors Jam horror game jams. Basing the premise and artifact on Hungarian mythology, Ronyai sculpted the titular statuette from clay, depicting its movements in the game by photographing it and using stop motion animation. In March 2025, the game was re-released on Steam with Japanese translations.

== Reception ==
Praising the game's ambience as "excellent" and "unsettling", Ed Thorn of Rock Paper Shotgun stated he "enjoyed how the clues flowed into research and discovery, and how those discoveries would warp the sculpture". Famitsu enjoyed the "subtle and eerie horror" without relying on jump scares. Shaun Prescott of PC Gamer similarly praised the game as "gloriously unsettling" and "richly atmospheric", finding it to be "more frightening" than it appeared. Jonas Höger considered the game's design was "particularly impressive" with a "creepy, lingering feel". Prima Games listed the game as one of the best free puzzle titles on Steam in 2025, commending its "solid atmosphere" and "creepy" tone. Meriel Green of Gamezebo stated the game was a "genuinely unique experience", lauding the statue as "rendered in a stop-motion style that gives it real weight and presence", and "has a superb sense of atmosphere and does not rely on cheap tricks to scare you".
