= Terrific Tales =

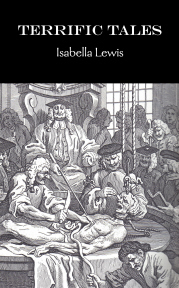
- Terrific Tales cover page, Second Edition
- Author: Isabella Lewis
- Cover artist: Ryan Cagle
- Language: English
- Genre: Gothic Fiction
- Published: 1804
- Publisher: Valancourt Books
- Publication place: United Kingdom
- Media type: Print (Hardcover)
- Pages: 108 pages
- ISBN: 0-9777841-5-0

Terrific Tales is the title of a collection of forty-four Gothic fiction short stories by Isabella Lewis, published in 1804 and originally printed by R. Cantwell of Temple Bar for J. F Hughes of Cavendish Square. James Fletcher Hughes was an important publisher of Gothic fiction between 1800 and 1811, publishing many texts. Nothing at all is known of the author of the present work, Isabella Lewis never published another book, and the name may in fact be a pseudonym. These stories all appear concerned with the supernatural and repeat themes with spectres, ghosts, demons and other supernatural events.

== About the stories ==
These short stories are all concerned with the supernatural. The supernatural is often left unexplained and topics range from, but are not limited to, Spectres, Hobgoblins, Ghosts the devil. The tales are all under 7 pages and cover unusual and varied topics.

- One story featuring a Spectre is 'A tall Spectre that appeared in the air...' This story concentrates on the peaceful town of Besanson on the morning of 3 December 1564. Out of the sky appeared the figure of a man about nine feet high and he exclaimed in an awful voice "people, people, people, amed or the end of your days is nigh." More than a thousand people were present and witnessed the spectre transform into a naked form and retire towards heaven. After about an hour a cloud over shadowed the town and several people were taken ill and suddenly died and the other inhabitants prayed to the Almighty to appease the weather. The other honest villagers came from miles around bringing their children too, the town had three days of the most lovely weather. Soon after followed heavy wind and rain, accompanied by a marvellous earthquake that ingulphed the city. Nothing remained for forty miles long and thirty broad but a church, castle and three houses which were stood in the middle of the city.
- One story containing Hobgoblins is 'Hobgoblins that appeared near the Castle of Lusignan in 1620.' This story proposes that on Wednesday evening 22 July 1620 between a castle and the park there appeared to be two fighting men. They were both composed of fire, powerful, with full armor and attacking each other in the most vigorous combat wielding a flaming sword and burning lance. This contest lasted a considerable time so in the end one of the two, who was wounded and falling, gave a horrible shriek that awoke several inhabitants. Soon after this battery was finished, a long train of fire seemed to pass along the river and penetrate into the park followed by several fiery monsters similar to monkeys. Several people who were in the forest were nearly frightened to death and a labourer who was among them in the forest was so terrified that it threw him into a dangerous fever that never left him. Some soldiers were also alarmed with the shriek that they mounted up the walls to see where the noise came from and they saw an amazing flock of birds pass over their heads. There were various birds screaming with a hideous and uncommon noise and a figure resembling the complete form of a man followed the birds, hooting like an owl. The people were so alarmed that they longed for the day that they could relate their terrors.
- A story regarding an unsettled ghost is 'The ghost of an old gentleman in chains...' In Athens there was a magnificent uninhabited house, it was empty due to the spectre which haunted it. The philosopher Athenodore arrived in the city and having seen a written paper that signified the house was to be sold at a low price, he purchased it and went to sleep there with his belongings. He was writing when he heard a noise as if chains were dragging along and at the same time saw the spirit of the old man advance towards him. Athenodore continued writing when the spectre made signs for him to follow it. The philosopher replied by making signs that the spectre stop so he could pursue his studies. Afterwards he took a lamp and followed the ghost which brought him into the yard then sunk into the earth. Athenodore without fear, took a stone to mark the place and returned to his chamber. The following day he informed the magistrates of what had happened, they went to the house and searched in the place he had pointed out, where they found the bones of a dead body loaded with chains. After this discovery the house was no longer disturbed.
- A story regarding the devil is 'The body of a woman that had been hanged invested by the devil.' In Paris on the 1st January 1613 during the heavy fall of rain, a young gentleman of the city was returning home in the afternoon from one of his friends houses. He met a handsomely dressed young lady in an alley who was adorned with a pearl necklace and rich jewels. She smiled and addressed the gentleman saying "Although, Sir, this tempestuous weather does not suffer me to commit myself to its mercy...occupying here without any permission, the entrance to your lodging,' she was asking to reside in his lodgings. Judging by her appearance and the way she addressed him he supposed he should return the politeness and he replied offered her his services. As he waited for her carriage she accepted his offer before they enjoyed supper together. He enjoyed her company so much during supper that he offered to accommodate her with a single bed. During the night he had a tormenting dream that the young lady was sleeping by his side and when he arose he didn't want anyone to presume anything had happened between them so he fetched his servant to wake her. The young lady said she had little sleep and didn't want to be disturbed so after the young man headed into the city and returned he sent his servant up again to wake the young lady. He ended up going into the room himself, calling her name and drawing the curtains open but when he felt her by the arm she was as cold as marble. He called for help but to no avail as her corpse was lifeless, the physicians said she had been dead for some time and the cause was that she had been hanged. It was proposed that it was the devil who had invested himself with her body and deceived the unfortunate gentleman. As soon as they suggested this a cloud of smoke arose in the bed followed by an unpleasant odor leaving the men confused and dazed.

== Contents ==
1. "A Note on the Text"
2. "The count of Macon, in the midst of life and health, transported into the air by a spectre in the shape of a horse"
3. "Count Despilliers and one of his soldiers nearly smothered between the bed and mattrass by an invisible hand"
4. "The body of a woman that had been hanged invested by the devil"
5. "The Ghost of Sancho three months after his death appearing to Pierre d’Englebert in Spain, at his bed-side by moon-light"
6. "The apparition of the Duke of Milan’s brother to two merchants"
7. "Hobgoblins that appeared near the Castle of Lusignan in 1620"
8. "Spectres that haunted the house of a Gentleman in Silesia through his rash wishes"
9. "Spirit of a Gentleman which burst through a casement in his Daughter’s bed chamber, at the hour of his death, invisible to every one except a dog, who continued barking till it vanished – A fact!"
10. "A Spectre loaded with Chains appearing to a Young Gentleman, who courageously followed it into a Garden, where it pointed out to him the spot where the bones of a person in Chains were actually discovered – A FACT"
11. "A troop of Spirits seen wandering at Narni in the middle of the day"
12. "The Ghost of Brutus appearing to him before his death"
13. "A young lady murdered by an evil Spirit through her impious wishes, and afterwards transformed into a Black Cat"
14. "The ghost of an old gentleman in chains, appearing to the philosopher Athenodore, a fact related by Pliny"
15. "The spirit of the Marquis de Rambouillet appearing to his friend the Marquis de Precy, as by appointed when alive"
16. "The death of Carlostadt, announced by a spectre that seized his youngest child and threatened to dash his brains out: afterwards ordered him to tell his father to prepare himself, as he should call again in three days"
17. "The awful dream of Xerxes, the king of Persia"
18. "The ghost of Desfontaines, appearing to his friend Mr. Bezuel to inform him that he had been drowned, according to a reciprocal agreement"
19. "A dream told by Cicero concerning two Arcadians who travelling together stopped at Megarda, and lodged at different houses. The one of them appeared to the other in a Dream, told him he was murdered by the innkeepers, and begged that he would look in the morning for his body, which was concealed in a waggon"
20. "The Ghost of Humbert Birk, a Flanderskin, that haunted a house in a manner similar to Scratching Fanny"
21. "The Spirit of a Gentleman appearing several nights to a Taylor in a cloud of Sulphur"
22. "An invisible Spirit that infested a Printing Office, boxed the ears of the Workmen, threw their hats about the room, pelted them with stones, and committed various acts of mischief"
23. "A Slave supposed to have been cut in pieces through his presumption in conjuring up Devils in an Old Castle at the Isle of Malta"
24. "A most extraordinary account of a Ghost that appeared to a Young Man. After lifting up his bed, and removing his bedstead several times, and making the most uncommon noises, threw him into a kind of trance"
25. "A tall Spectre that appeared in the air, warning the people of Besanson to amend – when a terrible earthquake ensued, which engulfed the whole city"
26. "The Spirit of a departed Soul appears to a Countryman, who found a Vase which contained its Ashes"
27. "A supernatural Agent appears to a Herdsman in the shape of a young Girl, and through its insinuations causes him to Murder his only Son"
28. "Two Gentlemen having promised that he who should die first should come and inform the other how he approved of immortality; at his Decease his Spirit actually appeared mounted upon a White Horse"
29. "An Angel appears to a religious Character in a Monastery"
30. "The Spirit of a Philosopher while sleeping transports itself into a distant Country"
31. "A Spectre appears to an Old Woman and points out a hidden treasure"
32. "A Spirit convinces a Philosopher in a Dream of the immortality of the Soul"
33. "A Book flies from one place to another, and opens by an invisible hand"
34. "The Apparition of a Woman after her decease visits and torments her Daughter"
35. "This Historical Tract, respecting Charles le Chauve, related by himself in Latin, was extracted from the manuscripts 2447, belonging to the National Library, in folio, page 188. The translation is as follows"
36. "The Ghost of a Nobleman appears in armour to his Commander under whose service he had lost his life"
37. "The Ghost of a Young Lady commits several acts of violence"
38. "A Young Gentleman troubled by the incantations of a Wizard. – A fact related by a Clergyman"
39. "The ghost of a woman appears to her husband five years after her death to warn him of his future conduct"
40. "A young gentleman who sold himself to the devil"
41. "The Night Mare"
42. "The Spirit of a Young Man appearing to a Clergyman under various awful shapes, and at every visit makes the most horrid groans"
43. "The Spectre of a Young Lady who was in the habit of visiting her sweetheart for the space of six months after she died"
44. "A wonderful and horrid Spectre that appeared to John Helias, Sir d’Audiguer’s servant, on the 1st January 1623 in the Church of St. Germain. The recital is by Sir d’Audiguer himself"
45. "The Spectre of a shepherd that appeared to several persons, when after having called them by their names, they died on that day week ensuing"

== Reception ==
Only reception appears to be from Diane Hoeveler when she proposes 'a series of short vignettes that purport to be true, although the contents are fantastical and reveal an interesting mix of residual supernaturalism combined with rationalizing Christian moral exemplum.'
