= Yel iyesi =

Turkic spirit or deity of wind

Yel iyesi (Chuvash: Ҫил ийи; Yakut: Тыал иччи, romanized: Tıal iççi; Turkish: Yel İyesi) is the Turkic spirit or deity of wind. The name comes from the Turkic words "Yel," which means wind, and "iye," the familiar spirit of any natural asset.

== Description ==
In Turkic mythology, the Yel İye are female fairy-like spirits who live in the wilderness and sometimes in the clouds. They were believed to be the spirits of women who had been frivolous in their lifetimes and now floated between the physical world and the afterlife. They usually appear as beautiful maidens, naked or dressed in sparkling beautiful white dresses and special fabulous robes.

It is said that if even one of her hairs are plucked, the Yel İyesi will die or be forced to change back to her true shape. A human may gain the control of a Yel İyesi by stealing a piece her of hair. If the hair is burnt, the Yel İyesi will disappear.

The voices of the Yel İye are not only very beautiful, but can also form large gusts of winds capable of lifting houses into the air. Despite their feminine charms the Yel İye are fierce warriors. The earth is said to shake when they do battle. They have healing and prophetic powers and are sometimes willing to help human beings.

== Yel Ana ==
Yel Ana (Cel Ene) is the Turkic and Altai goddess of wind. Also referred to as goddess of guidance. She is the female form of Yel iyesi. The name Yel Ene means 'Wind Mother. In Hungarian folklore her name is Szel Anya and she is referred to as the "queen of wind". She is a wise woman. The wind is controlled by this old lady called Szélanya (Wind Mother).

=== In other languages ===
- Tuvan: Салгын Ава, romanized: Salgın Ava
- Uzbek: Yel Ona
- Tatar: Җил Әни, Җил Ана, romanized: Cil Äni, Cil Ana
- Azerbaijani: Yel Ana
- Kazakh: Жел Ана, romanized: Jel Ana
- Chuvash: Ҫил Анне, Ҫил Абай
- Bashkir: Εл Апай, romanized: Yel Apay
- Yakut: Тыал Ий̃э, romanized: Tıal İye
- Turkmen: Ýel Ene, Yel Eje
- Turkish: Yel Ana
- Ottoman Turkish: يل آنا
- Kyrgyz: Жел Эне, romanized: Cel Ene
- Altay: Салкын Эне, romanized: Salkın Ene
- Khorasani Turkish: Чил Ине, Чил Иӌе, romanized: Çil İne, Çil İce
- Karachay-Balkar: Джел Ана, romanized: Cel Ana
- Hungarian: Szél-Anya

Its name is in Mongolian belief Салхи Ээж (Russian Buryat: Һалхин Эхэ; Oirat: Салькн Эк). And this entities have many similarities. Each has the same meaning, "wind mother".

== Yel Ata ==
Yel Ata (Çel Ede) is the Turkic / Altai god of wind. He is the male form of Yel iyesi. Çel Ede means 'wind Father'. In Hungarian folklore she is referred to as the Szelatya "king of wind". He is the Hungarian god of wind and rain. His armor and weapons are made of pure silver, his sacred metal. Yel Ata is a wind spirit in traditions of Azerbaijan too. He is usually described as a long haired and bearded man, and his name is Haydar (Azerbaijani: Heydər, Kazakh: Xayder).

=== In other languages ===
- Tuvan: Салгын Ата, romanized: Salgın Ata
- Uzbek: Yel Ota
- Tatar: Җил Әти, Җил Ата, romanized: Cil Äti, Cil Ata
- Azerbaijani: Yel Ata
- Kazakh: Жел Ата, romanized: Jel Ata
- Chuvash: Ҫил Атте, Ҫил Ашшӗ
- Bashkir: Εл Атай, romanized: Yel Atay
- Yakut: Тыал Аҕа, romanized: Tıal Ağa
- Turkmen: Ýel Ata
- Turkish: Yel Ata
- Ottoman Turkish: يل آتا
- Kyrgyz: Жел Ата, romanized: Cel Ata
- Altay: Салкын Ада, romanized: Salkın Ada
- Khakas: Чил Аба, Чил Ада, romanized: Çil Aba, Çil Ada
- Karachay-Balkar: Джел Ата, romanized: Cel Ata
- Hungarian: Szél-Atya

Its name is in Mongolian belief Салхи Эцэг (Russian Buryat: Һалхин Эсэгэ; Oirat: Салькн эцк). And this entities have many similarities. Each has the same meaning, "wind father".

== Wind in Turkish folklore ==
Wind symbolised in Turkish folklore a mischievous, sometimes violent character. In some myths and legends, the Wind was represented by a wild horse. Even today, Turkish people in Anatolia describe thoughtless people or horses as being "born of the wind". Because of his restless spirit / aeitiy, the Wind could not get along with Earth, Water and sometimes the Fire God. When angry, in the winter he sent down snowstorms and in the summer hurricanes, bringing misfortune. Some illness-bearing spirits or daemons appeared as winds and struck people. Western and northern winds were considered ominous in Turkish opinion. In January and February there were some very windy days and these months were called "Jil Aiy (Yel Ayı)", months of wind. Yel (the wind) was perceived as a stroke from the other world. The ancient Turkic community esteemed the Yel Ata (wind god) and in his honour constructed a temple and visited this temple before a military campaign and made sacrifices when asking for a victory.

Wind also brings diseases. Therefore, the ‘possession of wind’, a skill to control weather, was one of the characteristics of strong Kams (shamans) and other sacred persons. One of the main movements of a Kam (shaman) during ceremonies was spinning around on one’s feet. Blowing a light wind was considered an appeal to the supernatural spirits. This movement symbolically represented a whirlwind. People trusted the Yel Ata (Wind God), a force of nature that gave them energy. Such a whirlwind could steal the Kut (natural and spiritual energy power) of a human.

== See also ==
- Hungarian mythology
