= Hadúr =

Early Hungarian god of fire and war

Hadúr, or Hodúr in old Hungarian, short for Hadak Ura, meaning "warlord" or "lord of the armies" in Hungarian, was the god of fire, later became a war god in the religion of the early Hungarians (Magyars). In Hungarian mythology, he was the third son of Arany Atyácska (Golden Father) and Hajnal Anyácska (Dawn Mother), the main god and goddess. He had many siblings, including his two brothers: Napkirály (King Sun) and Szélkirály (King Wind). In Heaven, on the top of the World Tree on the first level there was the castle of Arany Atyácska, and Napkirály's Golden Forest below it, and Szélkirály's Silver Forest below it, and Hadúr's Copper Forest was the third. There he lived as a blacksmith of the gods. He is thought to be a great man with long hair and with armour and weapons made of pure copper, since copper was his sacred metal. He supposedly made the legendary sword, Sword of God (Isten kardja) which was discovered by Attila the Hun and secured his rule. It was customary for the Magyars to sacrifice white stallions to him before a battle.

== Bibliography ==
- Jordanes, The Origin and Deeds of the Goths ch. XXXV (e-text)
- The History of the Decline and Fall of The Roman Empire vol. 3 Ch. XXXIV Part 1
- Patrick Howarth, Attila, King of the Huns : Man and Myth 1995:183f.
- Hermann Fillitz, Die Schatzkammer in Wien: Symbole abendländischen Kaisertums, Illustration of the "Sword of God"
