= Blackfoot religion =

Religion of the Blackfoot people

The Blackfoot are a tribe of Native Americans who currently live in Montana and Alberta. They lived northwest of the Great Lakes and are a Plains Indian culture.

== Cosmology ==
In Blackfoot mythology, the supernatural world is dominated by the Sun. The Sun (Nah-too-si; Super powered or Holiness) is equated with the Creator (Apistotoke) by some anthropologists. The Creator is said to have created the earth and everything in the universe. Nah-too-si is sometimes personified by the mystical Napi, or Old Man. Napi was said to have been sent by the Nah-too-si to teach people how to live a sinless life, like he and his wife, Ksah-koom-aukie, Earth Woman. A-pi-su'-ahts(early riser) was the only surviving child of Sun and Moon, after the rest were attacked and killed by pelicans. Napi is said to have given the Blackfoot visions and, by implication, Blackfoot music.

The numbers four and seven, the cardinal directions, the six principle points and center, are important in Blackfoot mythology. Communication is believed to occur between the supernatural world and Blackfoot through visions of guardian spirits, during which songs and ceremonies may be imparted, such as that of medicine bundles. The physical world is seen as just a glimpse of the spiritual dimension, which is actually the true reality. The Blackfoot people name themselves "Real People" in comparison to anyone that does not possess the ability to communicate with the spirit world like the members of the Blackfoot tribe.

Ceremonies include the Sun Dance, called Medicine Lodge by the Blackfoot in English, in which sacrifices would be made to Sun. According to the legend the ceremony, the Sun Dance, was started when a human woman, named Feather-woman fell in love with Morning Star, the child of Sun and Moon. After plucking the sacred turnip she and her half-divine son were banished from the Sky-Country, and eventually she died leaving her son, Poïa (Scar-Face), orphaned. Eventually he makes his way back to Sky-Country and because his grandparents, Sun and Moon, took mercy on him he honored them by doing the Sun Dance once a year. These sacrifices ranged from offering sweat, through the use of sweat lodges to actual offerings of flesh, for example men from the tribe would rip off ropes tied to their skin as sacrifices to Sun. The Medicine Lodge would require the Blackfoot to promise vows of eventual sacrifice to Sun throughout the year after requesting protection from war or for family members, or after praying for the health of the tribe.

== Other deities and spirits ==
There are three subsections for which minor deities(and/or personifications of nature and animals) are placed into: Above Persons, Ground Persons, and Under Water Persons. Deities such as Thunder, Wind Maker, and Cold Maker were worshipped to influence certain changes in nature like bringing rain and stopping storms.

Amskapipikuni is said to be the inventor of tobacco and made the first war-time killing with an aspen stick.

The Sta-au are believed to be a type of ghost, specifically the ghosts of cruel men and women. Most of the deceased are said to live in certain parts of the hills, but the Sta-au are said to hang around camps. They are believed to cause bad luck and harm to living people, especially in the morning.

== Buffalo Dance ==
Historically, one of the primary sources of food many other needs for the Blackfoot was the American bison, colloquially referred to as the "buffalo", and as iiníí; pl. iinííksi in the Blackfoot language. The Buffalo Dance commemorates this reliance.

The typical hunting method was to drive a herd off of a cliff, and butcher them after they died at the bottom.

The night before the hunt, the shaman ceremonially smoked tobacco and prayed to the sun. His wives were not allowed to leave their home, nor even look outside, until he returned; they were to pray to the sun and continually burn sweet grass. Fasting and dressed in a bison headdress, the shaman led a group of people at the head of a V formation. He attracted the herd's attention and brought them near the cliff; they were then scared by other men hiding behind them, who waved their robes and shouted. The bison ran off the cliff and died at the rocks below.

According to legend, at one point the bison refused to go over the cliff. A woman walking underneath the cliff saw a herd right on the edge and pledged to marry one which jumped down. One did so and survived, turning into many dead buffalo at the bottom of the cliff. The woman's people ate the meat and the young woman left with the buffalo. Her father went in search of her. When he stopped to rest, he told a magpie to search for his daughter and tell her where he was. The magpie found the woman and told her where her father was located. The woman met her father but refused to go home, frightened that the bison would kill her and her father; she said to wait until they were all asleep and would not miss her for some time. When she returned to the bison, her husband smelled another person and, gathering his herd, found the father and trampled him to death. The woman cried and her husband said that if she could bring her father back to life, they could both return to their tribe. The woman asked the magpie to find a piece of her father's body; he found a piece of his spine. The woman covered the bone with her robe and sang a song. She was successful and her father was reincarnated. Impressed, the woman's husband taught them a dance which would attract the bison and ensure success in the hunt and which would restore the dead bison to life, just as the woman had restored her father to life. The father and daughter returned to their tribe and taught a small group of men, eventually known as I-kun-uh'-kah-tsi ("all compatriots"), the dances.

== See also ==
Blackfoot mythology

== Bibliography ==
- Nettl, Bruno (1989). Blackfoot Musical Thought: Comparative Perspectives. Ohio: The Kent State University Press. ISBN 0-87338-370-2
