= Szélanya =

Hungarian goddess or deity of wind

Szélanya (Old Turkic: Çel Ene or Cel Ana, "Wind Mother") is the Turkic goddess or deity of wind.

She is the daughter of Kayra, the primordial god.

Her male counterpart is Szélatya.

== Names in various languages ==
- Uzbek: Yel Ona
- Tatar: Җил Әни or Җил Ана or Cil Ana
- Kazakh: Жел Ана
- Chuvash: Ҫил Анне or Ҫил Абай
- Bashkort: Εл Апай
- Sakha: Тыал Ий̃э
- Turkmen: Ýel Ene or Yel Eje
- Kyrgyz: Жел Эне
- Khakas: Чил Ине or Чил Иӌе
- Balkar: Джел Ана
- Mongolian: Салхи Ээж
- Buryat: Һалхин Эхэ
- Oirat: Салькн Эк
- Altay: Салкын Эне
- Tuvan: Салгын Ава
- Turkish: Yel Ana

All of them mean, "wind mother".

The Onoghurs also worshipped her.

== Description ==
She is a wise, elderly woman who lives in a cave on top of a huge mountain somewhere at the end of the world. She rides the winds and creates storms and whirlwinds.

Szelanya has a Slavic version which is a nymph who has power over wind, in which she delights in causing storms. She lives around hills, mountains, and high mounds.

In Turkic and later Hungarian mythology, she is also believed to be a female fairy-like spirit who lives in the wilderness and sometimes in the clouds.

== Bibliography ==
- Mitológiai enciklopédia I. Főszerk. Szergej Alekszandrovics Tokarjev. A magyar kiadást szerk. Hoppál Mihály. Budapest: Gondolat. 1988. ISBN 963-282-027-4 (in Hungarian)
- Türk Mitolojisi Ansiklopedik Sözlük, Celal Beydili, Yurt Yayınevi (Page - 608) (in Turkish)

== See also ==
- Hungarian mythology
- Yel iyesi
- Szelatya
