= Aisoyimstan =

Wind god of Montana Blackfoot mythology

Aisoyimstan ('Cold maker') is a god associated with winter and snow in Montana Blackfoot mythology.

Aisoyimstan is the bringer of snow, frost and storm, who freezes the earth and blanket it with snow. He has the appearance of a white-colored man with white hair, dressed in white clothes and riding a white horse.
