= Szélatya =

Hungarian god or deity of wind

Szélatya or Szélkirály (Old Turkic: Çel Ede or Çel Ata, "Wind Father") is the Turkic god or deity of wind.

His female counterpart is Szélanya.

== Names in various languages ==
- Azerbaijani: Yel ata / Yel baba
- Uzbek: Yel Ota
- Tatar: Җил Әти or Җил Ата or Cil Ana
- Kazakh: Жел Ата
- Chuvash: Ҫил Атте or Ҫил Ашшӗ
- Bashkort: Εл Атай
- Sakha: Тыал Аҕа
- Turkmen: Ýel Ata
- Kyrgyz: Жел Ата
- Khakas: Чил Аба or Чил Ада
- Altay: Салкын Ада
- Tuvan: Салгын Ата
- Balkar: Джел Ата
- Mongolian: Салхи Эцэг
- Buryat: Һалхин Эсэгэ
- Oirat: Салькн эцк

All of them mean "wind father".

The Onoghurs also worshipped him.

== Description ==
Szelatya has long hair, silver weapons, and thunder horses. He is said to appear as a youthful and handsome man in Hungarian mythology, but as an elderly man in Turkic mythology. He has a jungle or sylvan named Silver Forest.

== Family ==
His father is Arany Atyacska (Golden Father) and his mother's name is Hajnal Anyacska (Dawn Mother). However, some accounts mention that he is the son of Kayra, the primordial god.

== See also ==
- Hungarian mythology
- Yel iyesi
- Szelanya

== Bibliography ==
- Mitológiai enciklopédia I. Főszerk. Szergej Alekszandrovics Tokarjev. A magyar kiadást szerk. Hoppál Mihály. Budapest: Gondolat. 1988. ISBN 963-282-027-4 (in Hungarian)
- Türk Mitolojisi Ansiklopedik Sözlük, Celal Beydili, Yurt Yayınevi (page 608) (in Turkish)
