= Hungarian mythology =

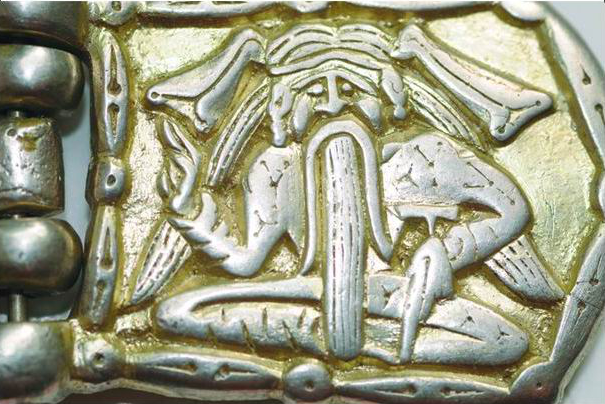
A 9th century fastener unearthed in Kirovohrad Oblast, Ukraine. The finding belongs to the possibly Hungarian "Subotcy find horizon".

Hungarian mythology includes the myths, legends, folk tales, fairy tales and gods of the Hungarians.

== Sources of knowledge ==
Much of Magyar mythology is believed to be lost. However, in the last hundred years scholars of the history of Hungarian culture have tried eagerly to recover a significant amount of Hungarian mythology. The most important sources are:

- Folklore, as many mythical persons remain in folk tales, folk songs, legends, also special traditions linked to special dates, unknown elsewhere
- Medieval chronicles
- Secondary sources such as accounts about Hungarians by other authors (mostly before 850 AD)
- Archaeological research

== Mythological cosmology ==
The World Tree carved on a pot

In Hungarian myth, the world is divided into three spheres: the first is the Upper World (Felső világ), the home of the gods; the second is the Middle World (Középső világ) or world we know, and finally the underworld (Alsó világ). In the center of the world stands a tall tree: the World Tree / Tree of Life (Világfa/Életfa). Its foliage is the Upper World, and the Turul bird dwells on top of it. The Middle World is located at its trunk and the underworld is around its roots. In some stories, the tree has fruit: the golden apples. In Hinduism and Buddhism, there are very similar beliefs in the Trailokya and Kalpavriksha.

=== Upper World ===
The gods live in the Upper World. Gods have the same rank, although the most important figure of them is Isten (Hungarian for "God"). He controls the world, shapes the fate of humans, observes the Middle World from the sky, and sometimes gives warning by lightning (mennykő). Isten created the world with the help of Ördög ("the devil" representing Evil). Other gods include: Istenanya ("Mother God"), also known as Boldogasszony ("Blessed Lady", literally meaning "happy/merry woman"; later identified with Catholicism's Virgin Mary), and Hadúr ("warlord" or "commander") of the fire, and later war god.

The major celestial bodies (the Sun and the Moon) are also located in the Upper World. The sky was thought to be a big tent held up by the Tree of Life. The several holes in it are the stars. The Sun, Moon, and symbols of the cosmic word, are known from Hungarian grave findings from the period of Hungarian conquest.

In Hungarian mythology, it was believed that the human soul (Lélek) is immortal, and life was seen as a peregrination to Heaven (Menny).

=== Middle World ===
The Middle World is shared among humans and many mythological creatures; the latter are often supernatural. There are ghosts of the forests and waters, who are ordered to scare humans. They have different names in different places. There are females, for example, the sellő (mermaid), which lives in water and has a human torso with the tail of a fish. The wind is controlled by an old lady called Szélanya (Wind Mother) or Szélkirály (Wind King). The Sárkány (dragon) is a frightening beast: he is the enemy of many heroes in fairy tales, symbolising the psychical inner struggle of the hero. The Sárkány usually has 1–7 heads. The lidérc is a ghostly, mysterious creature with several different appearances, its works are always malicious. The manók (elves / goblins) and the törpék (dwarfs) are foxy beings living in woods or under the ground. Óriások (giants) live in the mountains. They have both good and bad qualities. Favourite creatures are the tündérek (fairies), who are beautiful young virgins or female creatures (often depicted either as personified purity and innocence, or as playful and foxy). They aid humans, who sometimes can ask three wishes from them. Their opposites are the bábák, who are equated with catty old witches. (Bába means "midwife" in modern Hungarian, and originally they were wise old women, later equated with witches as Christianity became widespread.)

=== Underworld ===
The Underworld is the home of Ördög, creator of everything bad for humans: for example, annoying animals such as fleas, lice, and flies. It is uncertain whether the underworld was regarded as a place of punishment or not, since the naming of it as Pokol (Hell) developed after Christianization.

== Religion ==
Research about the ancient Hungarian religion has led to the conclusion that it was a form of Tengrism, a belief system originating on the Eurasian Steppe. Moreover, the Hungarian word for God, Isten is theorised to have derived from the Turkic word Tengri. Its stem may have been “Is Tengri”, with Is being an old variant of ős (meaning “ancestor” or “forefather”). Their religion may have been influenced by Hindus and Buddhists whom the Huns and Avars had encountered and converted to during their westward migration. Another theory ties the religion to that of the Huns and Scythians of Central Asia who converted to Buddhism in the largely Buddhist populace of Central Asia of those times due to similar or even identical legends to the Hungarian origin myth. It is also worth mentioning that contemporaries described a considerable portion of Hungarian pagans to follow, what they identified to be the Scythian religion by figures such as Andrew I. who ordered the abolishment of all Scythian idols.

The shamanic role was filled by the táltos ("wise man / blessed scholar"). Their souls were thought to be able to travel between the three spheres via révülés (meditation). They were also doctors. A taltos was selected by fate; their slight abnormalities at birth (neonatal teeth, caulbearer, white hair, and additional fingers) were believed to be the sign of a divine order. The steps of their introduction:

1. Climbing up on the "shaman ladder / shaman tree" symbolized the World Tree;
2. Drenching the ghosts: drinking the blood of the sacrificed animal.

They had the ability to contact spirits by specific rituals and praying. Thus, they interpreted dreams, mediated between humans and spirits, cured and removed curses, and had an ability to find and bring back lost souls. They directed animal sacrifices and guessed the reason of an ancestor's anger.

After death, the human soul leaves the body. The body is buried by relatives on the other bank of a river, looking towards east.

== Figures ==
=== Deities ===
Arany Atya (god)	Meaning "Golden Father". He was the consort of Hajnal Anyácska and father of Hadúr, Napkirály and Szélkirály. Possibly the same as Isten.
Boldogasszony (Mother goddess)	Also called "Istenanya". Her name means "Blessed Lady" or "Blessed Queen". She was the goddess of motherhood and helped women in childbirth. After Hungarians were Christianized with the help of St. Gerard of Csanad, her figure fell out of favor for that of the Virgin Mary. In later years the name "Boldogasszony" and "Nagyboldogasszony" (Great Blessed Lady) came to be used primarily as a name for the Virgin Mary. She is also considered the "Queen (Regina) of Hungary".
Hadúr (god)	Short for Hadak Ura, meaning "Warlord" or "Lord of Armies" and was the war god in the religion of the early Hungarians. He was the third son of Arany Atyácska (Dear Golden Father) and Hajnal Anyácska (Dear Dawn Mother) and was also the metalsmith of the gods. He wore armor and weapons made of pure copper, which is his sacred metal, and it was said that he forged the Sword of God (Isten kardja) which was discovered by Atilla the Hun and secured his rule. It was customary for the Hungarians to sacrifice white stallions to him before a battle.
Hajnal Anyácska (goddess)	Meaning "Dawn Mother". She was the consort of Arany Atyácska and mother of Hadúr, Napkirály and Szélkirály. Possibly the same as Boldogasszony.
Hold Atya (god)	Meaning "Moon Father".
Isten (god)	Meaning simply "God". Isten was the god of the sky and the head of the Hungarian pantheon.
Nap Anya (goddess)	Meaning "Sun Mother".
Napkirály (god)	Meaning "King of the Sun", he is the Hungarian sun god and is the oldest son of Arany Atyácska (Dear Golden Father) and Hajnal Anyácska (Dear Dawn Mother), brother of Hadúr and Szélkirály. He rides his silver-haired horse from East to West every day, seeing everything below him.
Ördög (god)	Meaning "Devil", He was the god of death, diseases and wicked things, and ruled the underworld realm.
Szélanya (goddess)	Meaning "Wind Mother", she is the goddess of wind and female counterpart of Szélatya. She is a wise, elderly woman who lives in a cave on top of a huge mountain somewhere at the end of the world. She rides the winds and creates storms and whirlwinds.
Szélkirály (god)	Meaning "King of the Wind", also called Szélatya ("Wind Father"), he is the Hungarian god of wind and rain and male counterpart of Szélanya. He is the second son of Arany Atyácska (Golden Father) and Hajnal Anyácska (Dawn Mother), brother of Hadúr and Napkirály. His armor and weapons are made of pure silver, his sacred metal.
Tűz Anya (goddess)	Meaning "Fire Mother". The goddess of fire and the female counterpart of Tűz Atya.
Tűz Atya (god)	Meaning "Fire Father", also called Tűz Apa. The god of fire and the male counterpart of Tűz Anya.
Víz Anya (goddess)	Meaning "Water Mother". The goddess of water and the female counterpart of Víz Atya.
Víz Atya (god)	Meaning "Water Father", also called Víz Apa. The god of water and the male counterpart of Víz Anya.

=== Animals and spirits ===
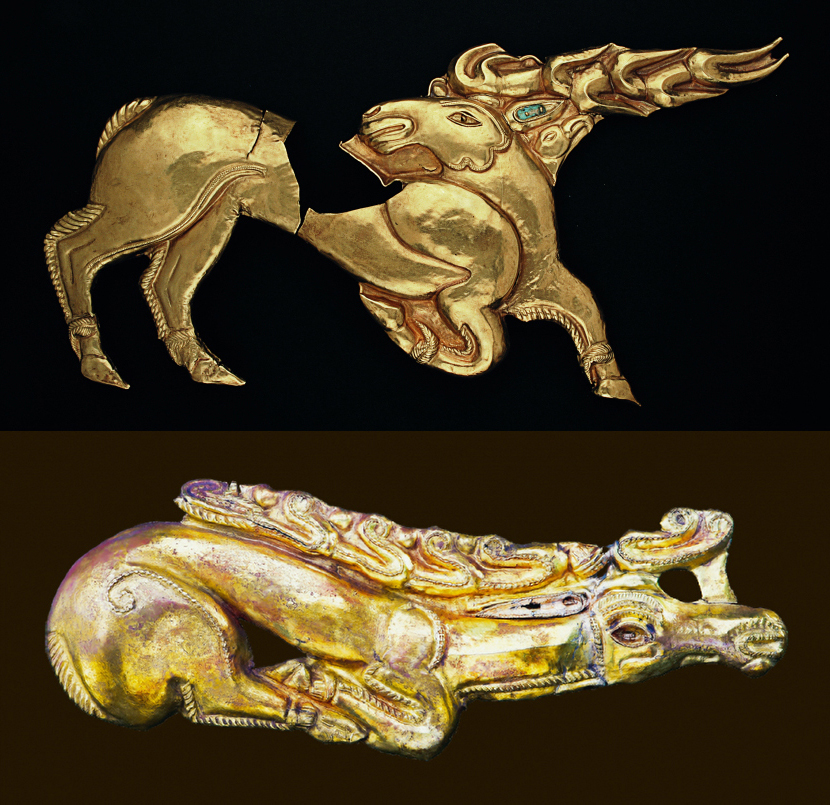
Scythian golden deer shield ornaments from the Iron Age 6th century BC found in Hungary. Above, the Golden Deer of Zöldhalompuszta is 37 cm, making it the largest Scythian golden deer known. Below, the Golden Deer of Tapiószentmárton.

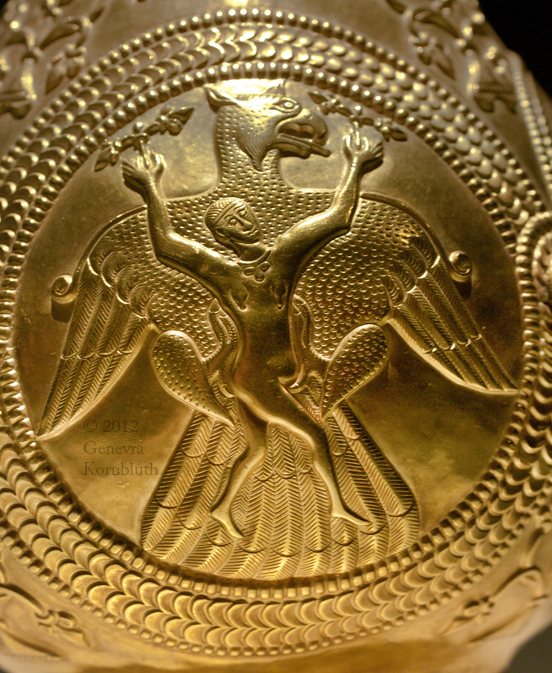
Illustration on the Treasure of Nagyszentmiklós depicting Álmos legend from the Hungarian mythology: Dream of Emese with the Turul bird.

Csodaszarvas (animal)	A central figure in the legends surrounding the origin of the Hungarian people. The name translates to "Miraculous Stag". According to Hungarian legend, preserved in the 13th century chronicle Gesta Hunnorum et Hungarorum by Simon of Kéza, while out hunting, the brothers Hunor and Magor saw a miraculous white stag (sometimes described as golden). They pursued the animal, but it always stayed ahead of them, leading them westward into Levedia, where they married two princesses and founded the Huns and Hungarian people. One of the main reasons for claims of religious and cultural ties between Huns and Hungarians is the stag and the brothers Hunor and Magor.
Bába (creature)	Meaning "old woman", she was originally a good fairy who later degraded and became evil. Although she had magical abilities, she was not a witch (boszorkány). She was thought to live in fountains, and if young children went too close to her lair, she lured them in.
Boszorkány (witch)	Meaning "witch", hostile, harm-doing, supernatural old lady. She had an ability to transform, fly and curse. A boszorkány corrupted the animals, for example, soured the milk of the cows. For humans, she brought an abrupt illness. They "operated" in the night, or in the nightfall.
Bubus (spirit)	A small being that lives in caves. See →Mumus.
Fene (spirit)	The demon of illness. Today, a common saying still uses its name: "A fene egye meg!", which literally means "Let it be eaten by the wolf!", and is uttered when something does not occur as one wishes. "Fene" is also considered the place where demons roam, i.e. the popular Hungarian curse "menj a fenébe!" is equivalent to the English "go to hell!". Modern Hungarian language also kept "fene" in names of some illnesses, like lépfene (anthrax).
Guta (spirit)	A fearsome Hungarian demon who beats his victims to death, often associated with strokes, heart attacks, or sudden paralysis.
Lidérc (creature)	A unique supernatural being of Hungarian folklore. It has three known varieties, which often borrow traits from one another: a miracle chicken or csodacsirke (the traditional form); a temporal devil or földi ördög; and a Satanic lover, ördögszerető.
Szépasszony (spirit)	Meaning "Fair Lady", she is a demon with long hair and a white dress. She appears and dances in storms and hail, and seduces young men.
Turul (animal)	The great bird resembling a falcon that was sent forth by Isten to guide the creation and destiny of the Magyar people. The first grand prince after Álmos. were the hereditary of Turul ("Turul nemzetség").
Vadleány (creature)	Meaning "Wild Girl", she is a forest sprite who seduces wanderers, saps their strength and makes the forest rustle. She is usually nude and her long hair reaches the ground. She can sometimes be lured and caught with one boot (she tries to put two of her feet in one boot).
Griff (animal)	Also known as griffin in other European countries, but without special features. In Hungarian mythology, it is similar to turul. Featuring in some fairy tales (like Fehérlófia, The son of the white horse), it is a cruel, greedy bird eating humans, but it is the only way to get back from Under World to Middle World.
Sárkány (dragon)	Appearing in almost all folk tales, this creature breathes flame and guards captive women and treasure, but unlike Western counterparts, it is always man-shaped, wields a weapon (often multiple), can ride a horse, and has seven heads, sometimes three, 12 or 21 (relating to numbers in astrology). Dragons usually symbolized human behaviour or character, i.e. when the hero was fighting with him, he was fighting to overcome his own bad behaviour, habit or characteristic.

=== Heroes and human figures ===
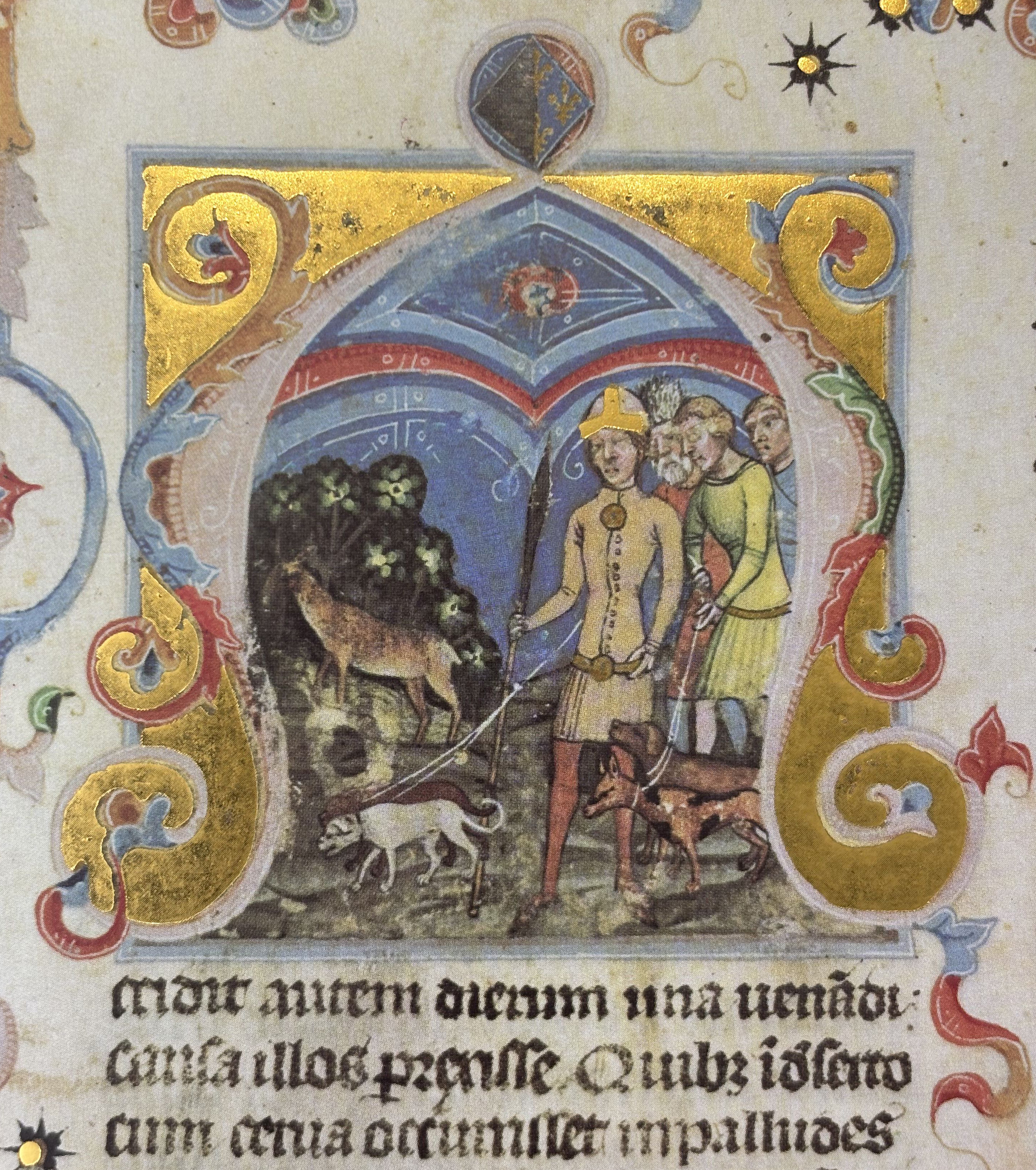
The hunt of the White Stag from the (Illuminated Chronicle)

Hunor and Magor (people)	During a hunt, the miraculous deer lured the brothers from Persia to the coast of the Sea of Azov (Méotis marsh), led the brothers to where they settled.
Emese (person)	Wife of Ügyek, mother of Álmos (meaning, "with the dream"). Emese ~ Eunodbilia: I., The name Emese became a feminine proper name from the word émés (vigil). II., Eunodbilia ~ In the case of decipherment in Ünődbeli, we get the stag, the miracle deer, as its totemistic ancestor. The buzzard's (Előd) female partner. III., according to the Emese dream legend (date: between 819–997), the turul bird (simurg) appeared in the dream of the pregnant Emese, which foretold to her that her descendants would become glorious kings.
Dula (person)	Hun-Bulgarian rulers (603–721) came from the Dulo family. This family is probably the same as the Duolu family (581–659) of the Western Türk Kaganate (581–742). The name Dulo can also be the same as the name Dula in the Hungarian chronicles (*prince here).
Garabonciás (person)	A male figure who learned magic, unlike the →táltos, who had the ability by birth. He is able to create storms. Some alumni were thought to possess these abilities as late as the 19th century.
Göncöl (person)	A legendary táltos (shaman) who was believed to have medicine that can cure any illness. He, or his wagon (known as Nagy Göncöl) is represented by the stars of the Big Dipper.
Mátyás király (person)	In English, he is King Matthias. He was the king of Hungary, Czechia and Croatia between 1458 and 1490. Once he even conquered Bécsvára (Vienna, literally the castle/fort of Vienna). In folk tales, he travels among Hungarian commoners in disguise to see how the nobles treat the commoners. If the nobles are tyrannical, he reveals himself and punishes them. He had the nickname Mátyás, az igazságos, or 'Matthias the Just'.

== Remnants in folklore ==
Comparative methods can reveal that some motifs of folktales, fragments of songs or rhymes of folk customs preserved pieces of the old belief system. Some records tell about shaman-like figures directly. Shamanic remnants in Hungarian folklore was researched among others by Vilmos Diószegi, based on ethnographic records in Hungary and comparative works with various shamans of some Siberian peoples. Ethnographer Mihály Hoppál continued his work of studying Hungarian shamanistic belief remnants, comparing shamanistic beliefs of speakers of Finno-Ugric languages related to Hungarian with those of other Siberian peoples.

== See also ==
- Érdy-codex
- Finnic mythologies
- Hungarian neopaganism
- Hungarian shamanism
- Komi mythology
- Magyar invasion legends
- Onogurs
- "Pole, Hungarian, two good friends"
- Tengrism

== Bibliography ==
- (in Hungarian) Zoltán Pintér: Mitológiai kislexikon. Szalay Könyvkiadó és Kereskedőház Kft., 1996.
- Diószegi, Vilmos (1998) [1958]. A sámánhit emlékei a magyar népi műveltségben (in Hungarian) (1. reprint kiadás ed.). Budapest: Akadémiai Kiadó. ISBN 963-05-7542-6. The title means: “Remnants of shamanistic beliefs in Hungarian folklore”.
- Hajdú, Péter (1975). "A rokonság nyelvi háttere". In Hajdú, Péter (ed.). Uráli népek. Nyelvrokonaink kultúrája és hagyományai (in Hungarian). Budapest: Corvina Kiadó. pp. 11–43. ISBN 963-13-0900-2. The title means: “Uralic peoples. Culture and traditions of our linguistic relatives”; the chapter means “Linguistical background of the relationship”.
- Hoppál, Mihály (1994). Sámánok, lelkek és jelképek. Budapest: Helikon Kiadó. ISBN 963-208-298-2.
- Hoppál, Mihály (2005). Sámánok Eurázsiában (in Hungarian). Budapest: Akadémiai Kiadó. ISBN 963-05-8295-3. The title means “Shamans in Eurasia”, the book is written in Hungarian, but it is published also in German, Estonian and Finnish. Site of publisher with short description on the book (in Hungarian)
- Hoppál, Mihály (1975). "Az uráli népek hiedelemvilága és a samanizmus". In Hajdú, Péter (ed.). Uráli népek / Nyelvrokonaink kultúrája és hagyományai (in Hungarian). Budapest: Corvina Kiadó. pp. 211–233. ISBN 963-13-0900-2. The title means: “Uralic peoples / Culture and traditions of our linguistic relatives”; the chapter means “The belief system of Uralic peoples and the shamanism”.
