= Ördög =

Creature in Hungarian mythology

Ördög (Ürdüng in Old Hungarian) is a shape-shifting, demonic creature from Hungarian mythology and early Hungarian paganism who controls the dark and evil forces of the world. After Christianization, it was identified with the devil. In Hungarian mythology God (Isten in Hungarian) had help from Ördög when creating the world.

Ördög looks somewhat like a satyr or faun, a humanoid with the upper torso of a human male and lower portions of a goat; usually pitch-black, with cloven hooves, ram-like horns, a long tail ending in a blade; and he carries a pitchfork. He can also be distinguished by his overly large phallus.

He dwells in the underworld or hell (Pokol in Hungarian), constantly stirring a huge cauldron filled with souls of those who lived in sin (however, it is uncertain whether the underworld was regarded as place of punishment or not in pre-Christian Hungarian mythology, since the naming of it as Pokol developed after Christianization). When he does come to earth, according to some legends, he hides in the walls of victims and makes subtle noises that sound high pitched and even squeaky. In other legends, when he comes to earth, he takes the form of a fox, a dark flame or a Hungarian shepherd with dark, sparkling eyes. It is his habit to make bets with humans to see if they become corrupted. His long-term goal is to collect more human souls (lelkek in Hungarian).
