= Lidérc =

Unique supernatural being of Hungarian folklore

A lidérc (Hungarian pronunciation: [ˈlideːrt͡s]) is a unique supernatural being of Hungarian folklore. It has three known varieties, which often borrow traits from one another.

The first, more traditional form of the lidérc is as a miracle chicken, csodacsirke in Hungarian, which hatches from the first egg of a black hen kept warm under the arm of a human. Some versions of the legend say that an unusually tiny black hen's egg, or any egg at all, may become a lidérc, or that the egg must be hatched by placing it in a heap of manure. The lidérc attaches itself to people to become their lover. If the owner is a woman, the being shifts into a man, but instead of pleasuring the woman, it fondles her, sits on her body, and sometimes sucks her blood, making her weak and sick after a time. From this source comes a Hungarian word for nightmare -- lidércnyomás, which literally means "lidérc pressure", from the pressure on the body while the being sits on it. Alternate names for the lidérc are iglic, ihlic in Csallóköz, lüdérc, piritusz in the south, and mit-mitke in the east. The lidérc hoards gold and thus makes its owner rich. To dispose of this form of the lidérc, it must be persuaded to perform an impossible task, such as haul sand with rope, or water with a sieve. It can also be destroyed by locking it into a tree hollow.

The second variety of the lidérc is as a tiny being, a temporal devil, földi ördög in Hungarian. It has many overlapping qualities with the miracle chicken form, and it may also be obtained from a black hen's egg, but more often it is found accidentally in rags, boxes, glass bottles, or in the pockets of old clothes. A person owning this form of the lidérc suddenly becomes rich and is capable of extraordinary feats, because the person's soul has supposedly been given to the lidérc, or even to the Devil.

The third variety is as a Satanic lover, ördögszerető in Hungarian, quite similar to an incubus or succubus. This form of the lidérc flies at night, appearing as a fiery light, a will o' the wisp, or even as a bird of fire. In the northern regions of Hungary and beyond, it is also known as ludvérc, lucfir. In Transylvania and Moldavia it goes by the names of lidérc, lüdérc, and sometimes ördög, literally, the Devil. While in flight, the lidérc sprinkles flames. On earth, it can assume a human shape, usually the shape of a much lamented dead relative or lover. Its footprints are that of a horse. The lidérc enters houses through chimneys or keyholes, bringing sickness and doom to its victims. It leaves the house with a splash of flames and dirties the walls. Burning incense and birch branches prevent the lidérc from entering one's dwelling. In the eastern regions of Hungary and beyond, it is said the lidérc is impossible to outrun, it haunts cemeteries, and it must disappear at the first crow of a rooster at dawn.

== Appearances in modern literature ==
A lidérc is mentioned in the famous historical novel The Name of the Rose by Umberto Eco.

But he knew a prodigious spell that would make every woman succumb to love. You had to kill a black cat and dig out its eyes, then put them in two eggs of a black hen, one egg in one eye, one eye in the other (and he showed me two eggs that he swore he had taken from appropriate hens). Then you had to let the eggs rot in a pile of horse dung (and he had one ready in a corner of the vegetable garden where nobody ever went), and there a little devil would be born from each egg, and would then be at your service, procuring for you all the delights of this world.

- mentioned in Katie MacAlister's novel Fire Me Up as a possible alternative to an incubus that forcibly attacked a human. Page 261.
- mentioned in Steven Brust's & Megan Lindholm's novel, The Gypsy.
- mentioned in Carol Goodman's novel The Incubus (re-released as The Demon Lover under the penname Juliet Dark).
- mentioned in Daniel O'Malley's The Blitz, the third novel of The Rook Files trilogy.
- mentioned in Frank Tallis 's novel Fatal lies.
- mentioned in Regine Abel's novel, ¡Ups He Invocado A Un Lidérc

== Appearances in media ==
A shape-shifting lidérc is revealed in Lost Girl episode "Caged Fae" (301).
