= Vadleány =

Spiritual being from Hungarian folklore

A Vadleány is a spiritual being from Central European (Hungarian) folklore. Similar to nymphs or dryads, Vadleány have extremely long hair, long fingernails, and are completely nude. According to the Encyclopedia of Fairies in World Folklore and Mythology, they seduce wanderers and steal their strength. The name translates to "wild girl". When one is present, the trees make a rustling sound. She could reputedly be caught by placing one boot where she habitually walked; out of curiosity she would try to put both feet in it and be caught.
