= Maisnil =

- Commune
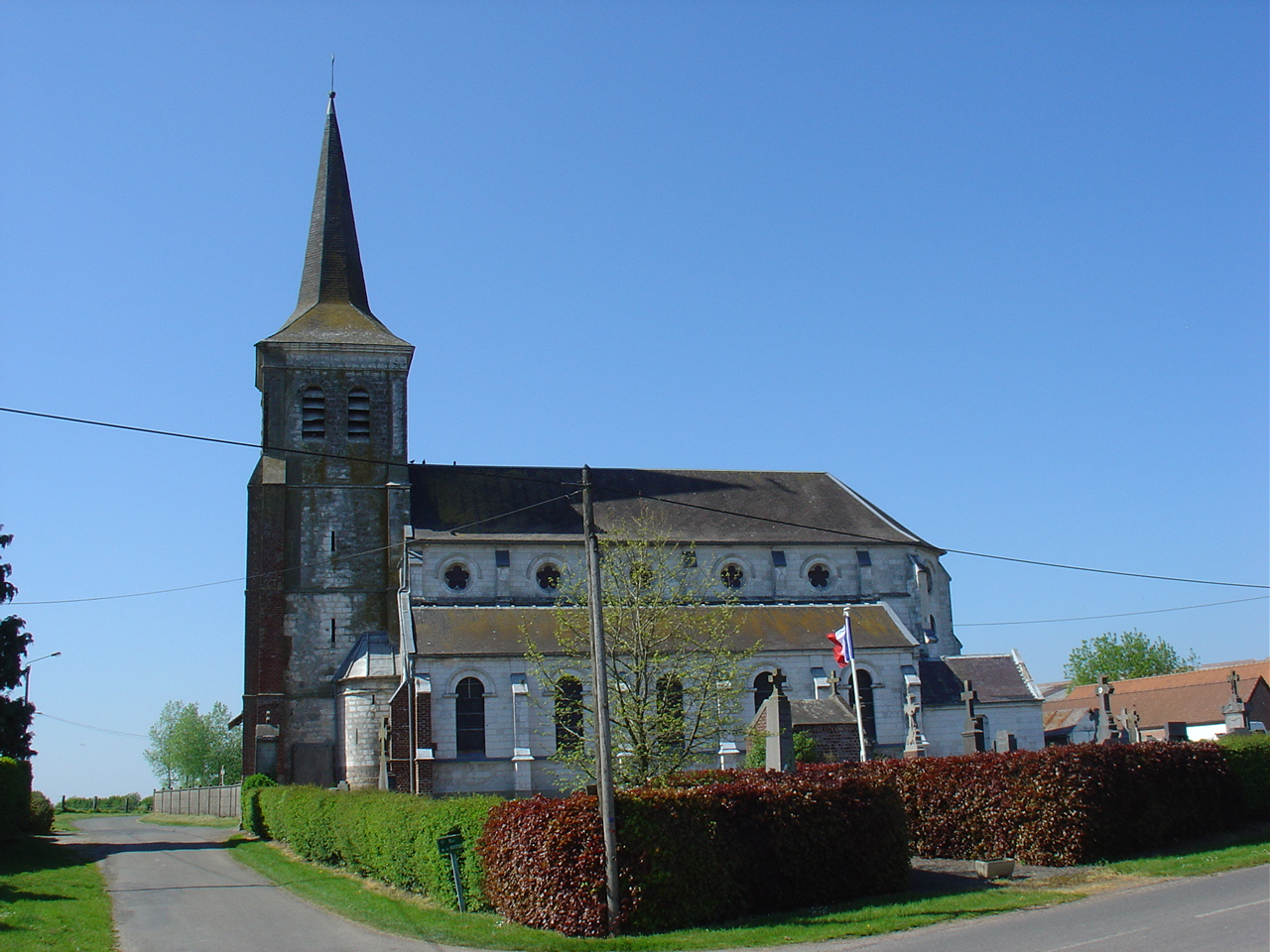
- The church of Maisnil

- Coat of arms
- Location of Maisnil
- Location within France Location within Hauts-de-France
- Coordinates: 50°20′47″N 2°21′55″E
- Country: France
- Region: Hauts-de-France
- Department: Pas-de-Calais
- Arrondissement: Arras
- Canton: Saint-Pol-sur-Ternoise
- Intercommunality: CC Ternois

Government
  - Mayor (2020–2026): Robert Champagne
- Area^{1}: 5.14 km^{2} (1.98 sq mi)
- Elevation: 156 m (512 ft)
- Highest elevation: 156 m (512 ft)
- Lowest elevation: 123 m (404 ft)
- Population (2023): 266
  - Density: 51.8/km^{2} (134/sq mi)
- Time zone: UTC+01:00 (CET)
  - Summer (DST): UTC+02:00 (CEST)
- INSEE/Postal code: 62539 /62130
- ^{1} French Land Register data, which excludes lakes, ponds, glaciers > 1 km^{2} (0.386 sq mi or 247 acres) and river estuaries.

Maisnil (French pronunciation: [mɛnil]; Picard: Umini) is a commune in the Pas-de-Calais department in the Hauts-de-France region of France 23 miles (37 km) west of Arras, south of Saint-Pol.

== Population ==
Historical population
Year	Pop.	±% p.a.
1968	205	—
1975	209	+0.28%
1982	207	−0.14%
1990	239	+1.81%
1999	244	+0.23%
2007	243	−0.05%
2012	256	+1.05%
2017	242	−1.12%
2023	266	+1.59%
Source: INSEE

== See also ==
- Communes of the Pas-de-Calais department
