= Clio Entertainment Awards =

American marketing awards program

- Awarded for: excellence in marketing and communications in film, TV, music, gaming, and live entertainment
- Location: Los Angeles
- Presented by: The Hollywood Reporter (1972-2014); Clio Awards (2014-present)
- Formerly called: Key Art Awards
- Established: 1971; 55 years ago
- First award: 1972

The Clio Entertainment Awards (formerly the Key Art Awards) is an awards program by Clio that recognizes "excellence in marketing and communications" across the entertainment industry—i.e., the industries of film, television, live entertainment, and gaming.

The awards were originally presented by The Hollywood Reporter from 1972 as the "Key Art Awards", which recognized creative achievements in the industry of film promotion, such as posters and other promotional materials (hence the name key art). They were incorporated into the Clio Awards in 2014 and renamed the Clio Key Art Awards, prior to reaching its current title.

== History ==
=== Key Art Awards ===
The establishment of the Key Art Awards was preceded by significant changes in the world of film promotion. During the late 1960s, film-marketing operations were based at studio offices in New York, with trailers distributed to theaters by the National Screen Service. Independent marketing agencies soon began to emerge to service the studios, eventually making their way to Los Angeles, where an industry of dozens of companies became established.

The Key Art Awards were founded in 1971 by publisher Tichi Wilkerson Miles of The Hollywood Reporter (THR). In May 1972, in announcing the new awards, Wilkerson Miles outlined the awards' mission statement: "The Hollywood Reporter proposes to honor an unsung group of artists, the talented men and women responsible for the conception and creation of the two-dimensional graphics which sell motion pictures and television programs." The first ceremony was held in the backyard of Wilkerson Miles' home, with less than 100 people.

In its first year, the awards program honored only North American film posters, slowly adding print categories for subsequent editions—hence the title "key art". The first six Award finalists were revealed on the front page of the July 17, 1972, edition of THR. Four posters by Bill Gold were among the six finalists: "A Clockwork Orange", "Dorian Gray", "The Night Visitor", and "There Was a Crooked Man". The remaining two were "Kotch" and the one-sheet for "Johnny Got His Gun", with the latter taking the top prize.

In 1973, the program added an international poster category, with "La Bataille d’Angleterre" as its first winner; in 1976, the section was split into European and Oriental (renamed "Asian" in 1987 and "Far Eastern" in 1988) poster groups; in 1980, a Latin American category was added in 1980; and in 1992, the geographic divisions were finally dropped. In 1975, the first poster advertising a television program—M*A*S*H—was submitted; such submissions would continue to be accepted until 1989.

By 1977, and for a decade after, the ceremony was held at the California Museum of Science and Industry in downtown Los Angeles.

In 1978, a "Special Programming" category was added to recognize film-festival and retrospective campaigns. In 1980, an "Electronic Exhibition" category was added to recognize film ads on radio and television. In 1986, the program began formal recognition of trailer work, as well as standees and billboards. Among nine nominated trailers that year, Michael Shapiro’s entry for The Jewel of the Nile became the first to win in the trailer category.

The awards were later maintained and advanced by THR editor-in-chief and publisher Robert J. Dowling, who went on to receive the "Key Art Special Recognition Award" in 2006.

In 1989, the program added a "Video Point of Sale" category in response to the advent of home video sweeping Hollywood, along with an award for video packaging the following year. In 1990, the program's 19th edition, the ceremony was moved to the headquarters of the Directors Guild of America in Los Angeles, where it would remain for 9 years. The ceremony then moved to the Kodak Theatre (now Dolby Theatre).

The program's "Lifetime Achievement Award" was introduced in 1991, with its first recipient being designer Saul Bass.

In 1999, an Internet category was introduced, with Sony's website for The Mask of Zorro (1998) being the first winner. Co-branded print and audiovisual categories were added in 2004, as well as special-recognition sections for trailer motion graphics and copywriting.

In 2002, THR partnered with UCLA Film and Television Archive to establish the Key Art Awards Collection, in which the permanent records associated with the Awards would be held.

In 2005, industry professionals voted The Silence of the Lambs poster and The Shining trailer as the best of the past 35 years.

A Visionary Award was introduced in 2007, recognizing filmmakers whose work inspires film marketers. That year, the ceremony was held at the Beverly Hilton. In 2008, the event was held at the Century Plaza, and an award was introduced for "best campaign," given to the studio or distributor that implements the most successful marketing strategy. In 2010, the ceremony moved downtown to a former Roman Catholic cathedral, and a new overall award for integrated marketing was introduced.

In 2011, a new award trophy was created in the form of a moveable golden searchlight by the New York firm Society Awards.

=== Clio Entertainment ===
In 2014, the Key Art Awards were acquired by the Clio Awards and renamed Clio Key Art Awards, now returning to the Dolby Theatre.

The program would go on to be renamed in 2017 to the Clio Entertainment Awards, now dedicated to the marketing industries in film, television, live entertainment, and gaming.

Being postponed in 2020 due to the COVID-19 pandemic, the Clio Entertainment Awards ceremony returned in 2021, where voiceover artist Tom Kane received an honorary Clio Entertainment Award.

== Jury ==
During the first decade of the Key Art Awards, judging was done by a small panel of participants, mostly art academics and museum representatives (such as James Soudon, dean of the Otis Art Institute, and Jan Stussy, UCLA art department faculty member).

The Hollywood Reporter staff members and designers also participated. From 1977 to 1990, a key player in the judging process was Pacific Theatres executive Robert Selig. Designer Saul Bass was another notable jury member, having served from 1986 to 1989, and became the first Key Art lifetime achievement honoree in 1991.

By 1993, the process was updated so that judging would be done by a panel drawn exclusively from within the marketing industry. That year's panel included 35 preliminary and 12 final judges, a total that would grow to over 300 by 2006.

== See also ==
- Key Art Awards 2006
- Clio Awards
- Film promotion
