= Head shot =

Portrait in which the focus is on the face

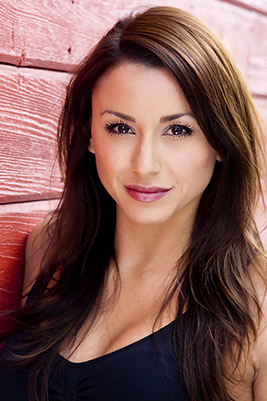
Head shot of Canadian actress Michelle Borromeo in 2011

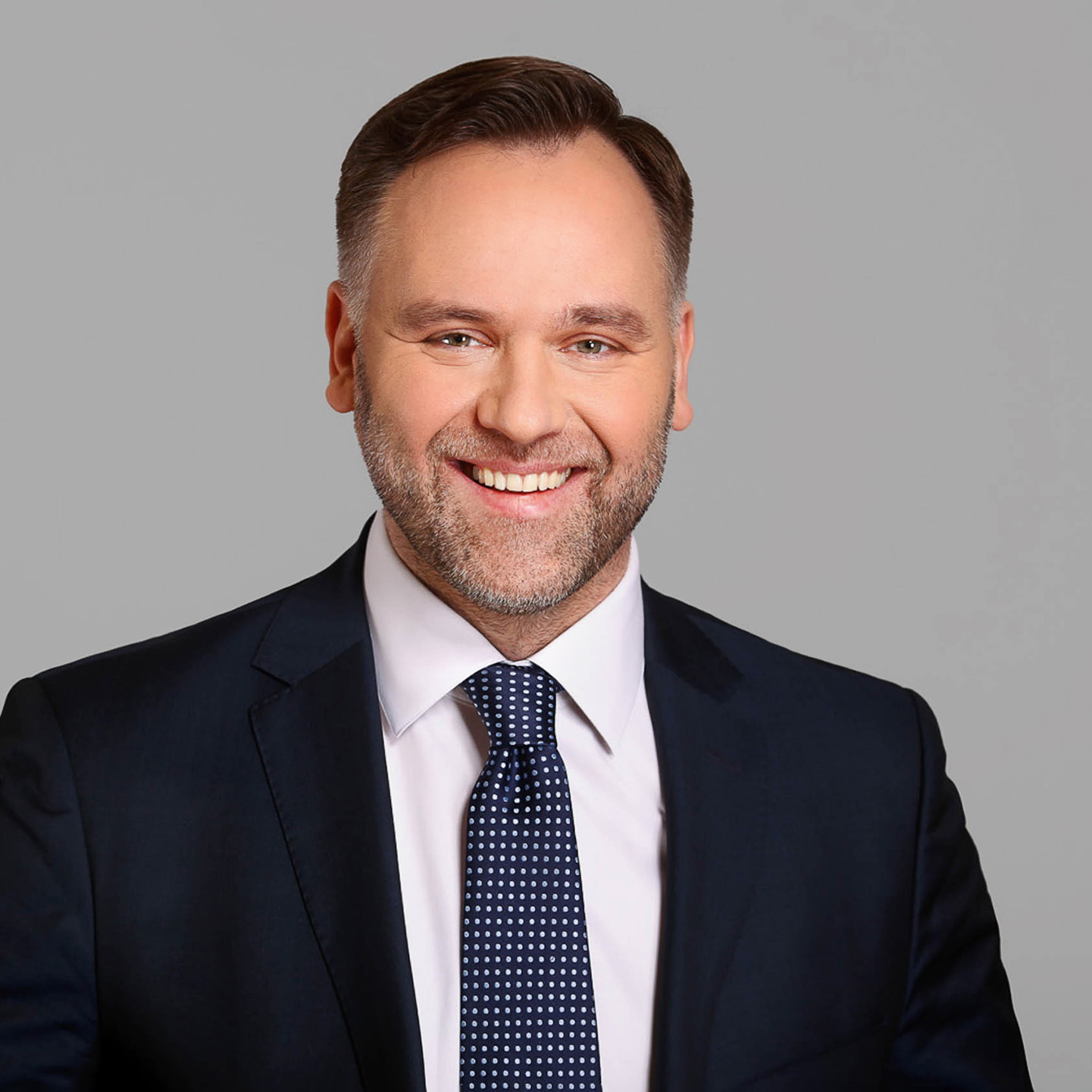
Corporate head shot

A head shot or headshot is a photographic portrait in which the focus is on the subject's face. The term is usually applied to professional profile images on social media, images used on online dating profiles, and promotional images of actors, models, and authors.

== Entertainment industry ==
In theater, film, and television, actors, models, singers, and other entertainers are often required to include a head shot, along with their résumé, when applying for a job. Those head shots are intended for helping them land a career, an actor head shot should help casting directors understand the person exactly as they are (i.e., age group & ethnic background), while the actor hopes that the head shot will inspire the casting director to hire them. Head shots often feature the actor or actress facing off-center. A performer will often have head shots expressing different poses and expressions to give a potential employer an idea of the subject's range of appearances or expressions. These types of head shots are called "looks". It is common for an actor to have different head shots for different roles, but for the most part these consist of a change in attire. The head shots that include a person's shoulders are called "three-quarter" shots. Previously, head shots were often in black-and-white; however, most head shots are now taken in color.

Actors' head shots, when they are printed and not simply uploaded online to an industry database, are done in an 8"×10" format. Other promotional images, for example, press shots and lobby prints, may be in many different aspect ratios. Acting head shots are often not photographic prints, instead they are typically printed via a lithographic or laser process.

The main purpose of an actor's head shot is identification. Therefore, the most important feature of an actor's head shot is that it represents the subject. Theatrical head shots are usually very "neutral" looking shots of the actor and clearly show their facial features.

Head shots are intended to show a person as they currently appear and reflect their best qualities. Therefore, if an actor's hair has been recently cut or colored, they would often get a new head shot to reflect their new image. Additionally, if an actor has a scar or facial blemish, it is expected to be visible on the head shot and not digitally removed from the image. Pimples or spots are temporary and, therefore, are usually digitally retouched.

== Modeling industry ==
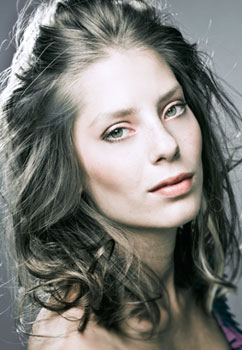
Modeling head shot

Modeling head shots or comp cards, sometimes also called tear sheets, are a compilation of images for casting in one sheet with a résumé of work, name and relevant statistics. They are often done in color; however, in some jurisdictions, such as the UK, they may be in black-and-white. Models often use them for castings and modeling work applications.

Modeling head shots are usually used for:

- Comp cards or tear sheets.
- Modeling portfolios.
- TV advertisements for skin products.
- Magazine advertisements for creams and other skin or hair products.
- Online industry profiles.

Models' head shots are also often professionally retouched to ensure their close-up beauty photograph appears perfect without blemishes or spots.

Comp cards are one of the cornerstones of a model's "marketing materials". They are about 5½×8" and printed on both sides. Almost all comp cards are in color but may include black-and-white images. A model may have four to five images on the comp card and at least one of these images will be a head shot.

== AI generation ==
Artificial intelligence can be used to generate idealized professional portraits from a selection of photographs of an individual.

A 2024 Ringover survey of 1,087 recruiters found that 74% were more likely to interview applicants who submitted head shots, and 77% preferred AI-generated head shots over real ones, but 66% would be put off if they thought the image was artificial. Respondents could only correctly classify head shots as real or artificial 40% of the time. The survey also found that 88% thought candidates who used AI-generated images should disclose this fact.

Issues reported with the technology in 2024 included difficulties accurately representing body types, hair styles, and detailed features like hands and jewelry.

== See also ==
- Close-up, for use in film-making
- Mug shot
- Photography
