= Matthew Chojnacki =

American writer on film and music

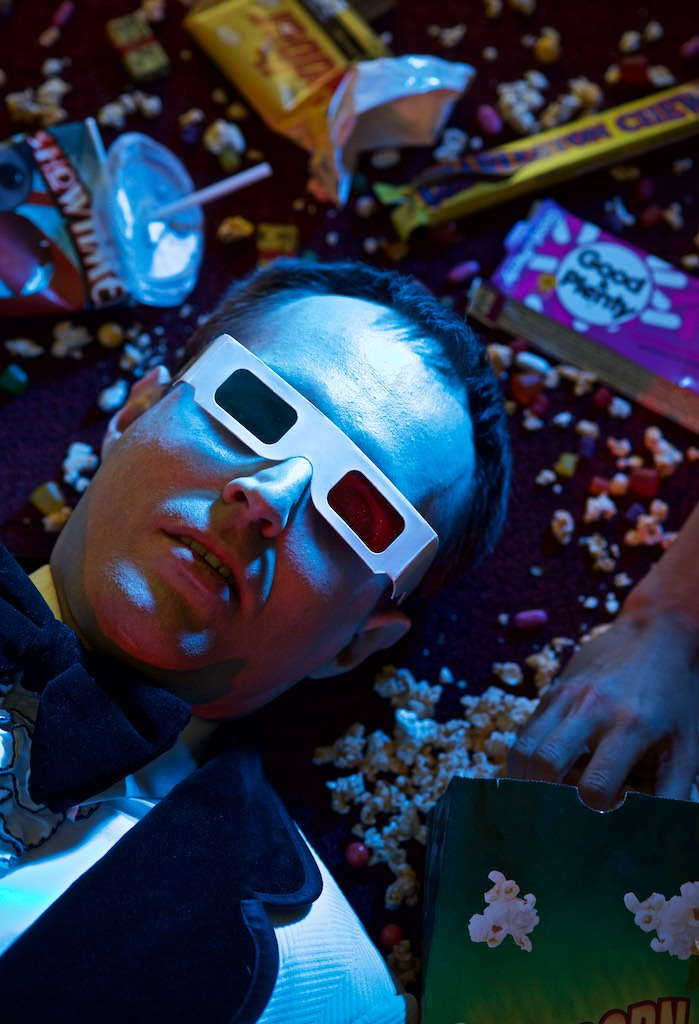
- Born: January 4, 1975 (age 51); Cleveland, Ohio, U.S.
- Education: Baldwin-Wallace College (MBA)
- Occupation: Author
- Writing career
- Genres: Music, Pop Culture
- Website: www.matthewchojnacki.com

Matthew Chojnacki (born January 4, 1975) is an American writer on film and music. Chojnacki's company, 1984 Publishing, releases pop culture books and soundtracks LPs.

His books include Put the Needle on the Record: The 1980s at 45 Revolutions Per Minute, a collection of vinyl single record sleeves from the 1980s, coupled with original commentary from over 125 musicians, graphic designers, and photographers. Jake Shears of Scissor Sisters wrote the book's foreword, and Nick Rhodes of Duran Duran the afterword. Put the Needle on the Record won several awards, including overall second prize in the Next Generation Indie Book Awards.

Chojnacki's follow-up book, Alternative Movie Posters: Film Art from the Underground was released in October, 2013, and illustrated the underground film poster movement through 200 one-sheets from 100+ designers. A sequel, Alternative Movie Posters II: More Film Art from the Underground was published in December, 2015. Both volumes made several year-end "best of" lists, including The Daily Beast, The A.V. Club, Under the Radar, and The Verge, among others.

Chojnacki is Executive Producer of several films, including Scream Queen, My Nightmare on Elm Street, the poster art documentary Twenty-Four by Thirty-Six as well as the counter-culture art documentary 30 Years of Garbage: The Garbage Pail Kids Story.
