= The Fall of Language in the Age of English =

2008 nonfiction book by Minae Mizumura

- Cover of Japanese edition
- Author: Minae Mizumura
- Original title: 日本語が亡びるとき (When the Japanese Language Falls)
- Translator: Mari Yoshihara; Juliet Winters Carpenter
- Language: Japanese
- Genre: Essay
- Publisher: Chikuma Shobō (Japan), Columbia University Press (US)
- Publication date: 2008
- Publication place: Japan
- English publication date: 2015
- Media type: Print
- Pages: 336
- Awards: Hideo Kobayashi Prize
- ISBN: 9784480814968

The Fall of Language in the Age of English (日本語が亡びるとき 英語の世紀の中で, Nihongo ga Horobiru Toki: Eigo no Seiki no Naka de) is a Japanese non-fiction book by novelist Minae Mizumura. First published in 2008, the book argues that the Japanese language and Japanese literature are in decline, in part due to the influence of English as a global language, and in part due to failures in Japanese education. Mizumura's criticisms of contemporary Japanese literature and recommendation to eliminate compulsory English language education generated significant public controversy in Japan.

The Fall of Language in the Age of English became a bestseller in Japan and received the Hideo Kobayashi Prize. An expanded English version, translated and revised by Mari Yoshihara and Juliet Winters Carpenter, was published in 2015, and extended parts of the original work's argument to make the work more relevant to readers outside Japan. The English version received mixed reviews in the English-language press, with several reviewers criticizing its assumptions about Japanese uniqueness.

== Summary ==
After relating some of her experiences with other writers working in non-English languages during her time in residence at the International Writing Program, Mizumura describes a theory that puts the various languages of the world into three categories. Following Benedict Anderson and his idea of imagined community, Mizumura links the idea of a written "national" language to the idea of nation-building by suggesting that a national literature solidifies spoken "local" language into a common written language, thereby allowing people who read that "national" language to imagine themselves as part of a nation. "Universal" languages, the third category, are languages such as Latin or English that have been used widely for intellectual activities such as law, trade, and scholarship across national boundaries. In practical terms, Mizumura defines a "universal" language as the most common second language of people around the world.

Building on Anderson's theory, Mizumura relates a history of the Japanese language and its transition into a "national" language, including the development of multiple writing systems, the forced opening of previously un-colonized Japan to the world, and the construction of an intellectual culture around translating foreign works into Japanese. Taking Natsume Sōseki's works as illustrative examples, Mizumura argues that this unique transition has disconnected modern readers of Japanese from their literary history at two points: first, as the written language's connections to classical Chinese were lost, isolating later readers from earlier writing; and second, as postwar efforts at written language reform devalued and diminished the written language to the point where current readers cannot even understand, much less write, novels comparable to works of literature written during Sōseki's time.

The book concludes with a proposal for changing how Japan's schools treat Japanese and English. For Mizumura, the asymmetry of influence between the "universal" language of English and national languages is made stronger than ever by the dominance of English on the internet. At the same time, she points out that Japanese education policy has not provided a counterweight to the dominant power of English, requiring years of compulsory English courses for students while requiring almost no engagement with classic Japanese texts. Instead of trying to give everyone an education in English that they may not want, Mizumura proposes, Japan should expand the teaching of Japanese literature in public schools, and focus English education resources only on those few students who show the aptitude and desire to become capable in both languages.

== Background ==
Mizumura's family moved from Japan to the United States when she was 12. Rather than focusing on improving her English language skills, she instead focused on improving her Japanese language skills by reading volumes from a collection of works of classic Japanese literature that her family had received as a gift from a relative. She remained in the United States until she completed a graduate degree in French literature at Yale University, then returned to Japan in 1990 to pursue a career as a novelist.

According to Mizumura, her engagement with Japanese literature was driven by homesickness and a feeling of being out of place in the US. But upon her return to Japan she was surprised by what she viewed as the low quality of contemporary Japanese literature, and she gradually developed the arguments and proposals in The Fall of Language in the Age of English both as a chronicle of her personal history with languages and as a criticism of literature and literacy in contemporary Japan. The Fall of Language in the Age of English was her first non-fiction book.

== Publication and reception ==
=== Initial publication ===
In 2008, Chikuma Shobō published the first edition of the book in Japanese under the title Nihongo ga Horobiru Toki: Eigo no Seiki no Naka de (lit. When the Japanese Language Falls: In the Age of English). The book became what literary scholar and translator Jay Rubin has called "one of the most widely discussed non-fiction titles ever published". Some reviewers, such as novelist and poet Natsuki Ikezawa, largely avoided stoking controversy over Mizumura's proposals. Reviewing the book for Mainichi Shimbun, Ikezawa instead praised the clarity of Mizumura's theory, particularly the theoretical connection between the maintenance of the Japanese language and the possibility of creating Japanese literature. Novelist Akiko Ohtake, writing for the Books Kinokuniya website, identified Mizumura's concern about the state of modern literature as the driving force of the book, but questioned the basis for her concern, while also finding Mizumura's arguments from patriotism to be unpersuasive.

Online reactions were less restrained. Literary scholar Haruo Shirane has described the online response as "an Internet sensation in which legions of bloggers gave their opinions", and media scholar Chiki Ogiue has cited the flame war around the book as an example of how arguments escalate online. Shirane observes that Mizumura was attacked from both the left and the right, with critics on the political left emphasizing the similarities between prewar imperialism and Mizumura's ideas about national language, and critics on the political right objecting to her contention that Japanese language and literature were in decline. Ogiue points to a specific flashpoint involving popular blogger and Hatena board member Mochio Umeda. Umeda wrote a positive review on his Hatena blog suggesting that every Japanese person should read Mizumura's book. After receiving significant negative feedback on Hatena, Umeda responded on Twitter by dismissing negative reaction to his review on his company's own platform as "too much stupid stuff", which further escalated the contentious online discussion around the book.

The Japanese version of The Fall of Language in the Age of English was a bestseller, selling over 65,000 copies. A discussion between Mizumura and Umeda about English, Japanese, literature, and the internet was published in the January 2009 issue of Shinchō magazine. Later that year, The Fall of Language in the Age of English received the 8th Hideo Kobayashi Prize. The prize, which is sponsored by Shinchō publisher Shinchosha and includes prize money in the amount of ¥1,000,000, is awarded annually to a non-fiction work that displays flexible and original thinking. The Japanese version of the book was subsequently reviewed in the New York Times, with reviewer Emily Parker acknowledging the "simplification" of the Japanese language, particularly with the introduction of internet and mobile phone technologies, but also citing evidence that Japanese people as a whole were reading and writing more than ever before.

=== English translation ===
Mizumura delivered early versions of the book's arguments as academic talks to English-speaking audiences at Yale University, Columbia University, and the 2007 annual meeting of the Association for Japanese Literary Studies. According to Mizumura, she had anticipated the need to revise seemingly "overly patriotic" passages for any eventual English translation, but University of Hawaiʻi at Mānoa professor Mari Yoshihara so quickly translated the Japanese edition and found the US publisher, Columbia University Press, that Mizumura was temporarily too busy with other commitments to make her own planned revisions. Once able to proceed, Mizumura worked with translator Juliet Winters Carpenter to revise and expand the book for English-speaking audiences. The English version was published by Columbia University Press in 2015 under the title The Fall of Language in the Age of English.

Despite Mizumura's efforts to tone down the apparent patriotism of the Japanese original, reviewers of the English edition compared passages of the book to the claims of "wartime ideologues", alleged that the book was "rife with examples of Nihonjinron (theories of Japanese uniqueness)", and suggested that several parts of the book "reinforce the perception that her call for a defence of Japanese language is entangled with ethnic nationalism". Haruo Shirane additionally noted that the part of Japan's literary history that Mizumura admired and defended in the book coincided with Japan's strongest imperialist and colonialist ambitions, including the period during which Japan established Japanese as the language of occupied Korea and Taiwan.

Reviewers of the English version generally agreed with the book's points about the growing and homogenizing influence of English. In an essay for the Financial Times, Simon Kuper concurred that the increasing emphasis on perfect English, particularly in social media and journalism, was "bad news for non-English languages and literatures". Writing for Claremont Review of Books, Mark Heberle agreed that English "is the virtually inescapable medium for those desiring to be taken seriously". But reviewers questioned whether the effects of this homogenizing influence were unique to the Japanese context, and whether they were entirely negative. As Graham Oliver wrote for The Rumpus, the homogenizing effects of English are a "tragedy felt by readerships across the globe". And while largely agreeing with Mizumura about the "flattening and homogenizing effect" of English, literary scholar Stephen Snyder observed that it enabled Japanese writers such as Haruki Murakami to reach a global audience, which then opened doors worldwide for translations of other works of Japanese literature.
