= Indie Book Awards =

Indie Book Awards may refer to

- Indie Book Awards (Australia), presented by Australian Independent Booksellers
- Next Generation Indie Book Awards, international awards based in the US presented by the Independent Book Publishing Professionals Group
