= L. James Rice =

American fantasy novelist

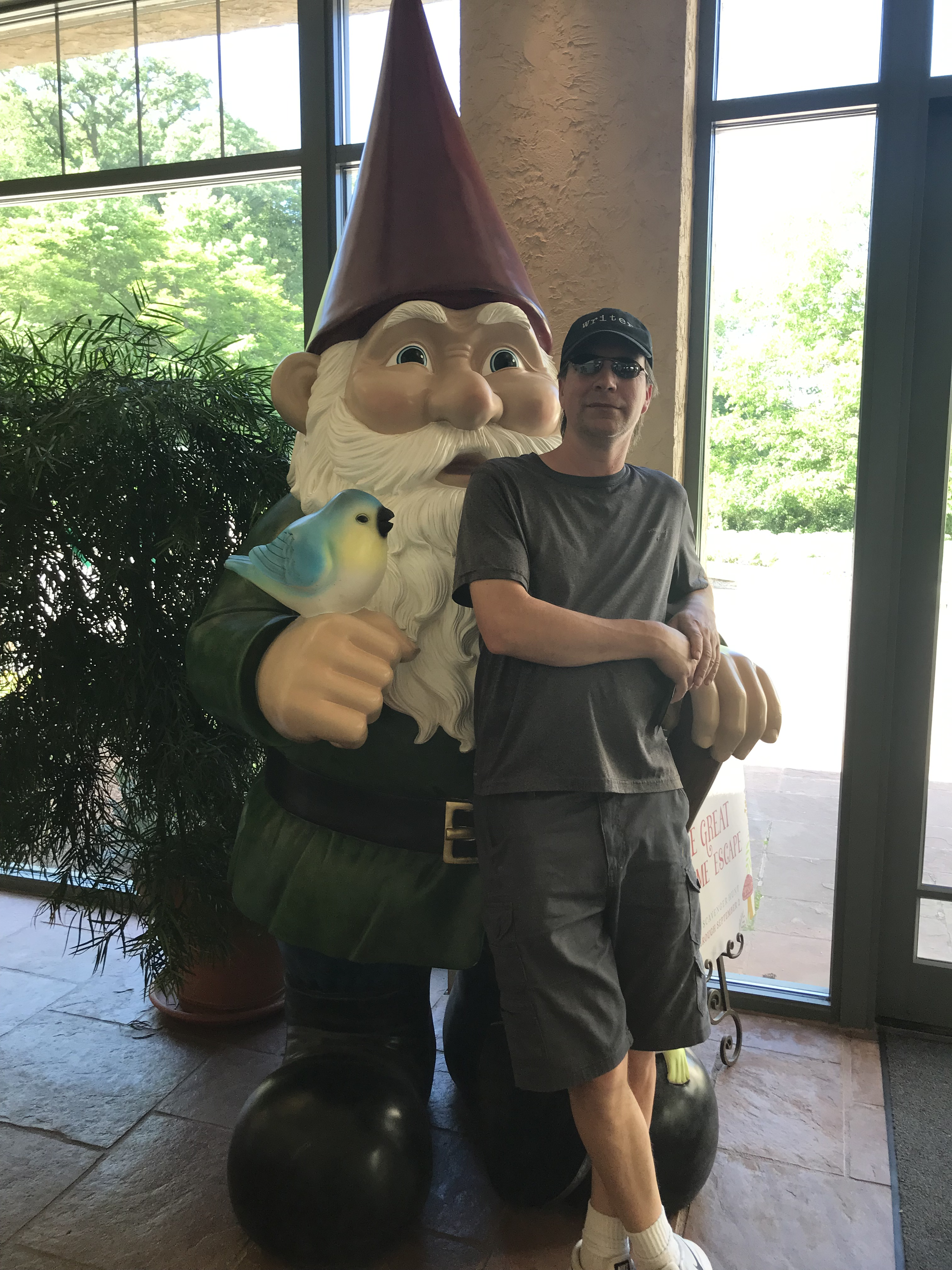
Author L. James Rice at Lauritzen Gardens in Omaha, NE, 2019.

L. James Rice (Lee James Rice, b. 29 July 1968) is the award-winning author of the fantasy novel series Sundering the Gods Saga.

Rice studied English at the University of Northern Iowa and screenwriting at UCLA before turning his attention to writing novels. Rice is an Active Member of the Science Fiction and Fantasy Writers of America.

Rice's first book, Eve of Snows, was published June 25, 2018. Eve of Snows earned an Editor's Pick Review at Booklife by Publishers Weekly, and a 5-Star Review from Indiereader.com In December 2019, Eve of Snows won the Epic Fantasy Fanatics Readers Choice Award, and early in 2020 the book won the Next Generation Indie Book Awards in the Fantasy Category while also taking the Second Place Grand Prize in all of Fiction. It also took Third Place in the Independent Publisher Book Awards for Fantasy

The Sundering the Gods series is a tale told from the experiences of multiple characters in a close 3rd Omniscient Point of View. The Sundering the Gods Saga is set in a secondary world known as The Sister Continents. The series concluded on June 25, 2020, with the release of Whispers of Ghosts.

L. James Rice resides with his wife and two daughters in southwest Iowa.

== Novels ==
Sundering the Gods Saga

- Eve of Snows
- Meliu
- Trail of Pyres
- Solineus
- Whispers of Ghosts

Standalone Novels

- The Contessa of Mostul Ûbar (Upcoming)
- Best Painted in Blood (Upcoming)

Sundering the Crowns Saga

- Shadows of Man
- Silhouettes in Doom (Upcoming)

== Awards ==
- 2019 Epic Fantasy Fanatics Readers Choice Award
- Winner 2020 Next Generation Indie Book Awards for Fantasy
- Grand Prize 2020 Next Generation Indie Book Awards for Fiction
- Bronze Medal 2020 Independent Publisher Book Awards for Fantasy
