= Fumiko Enchi =

Japanese writer (1905–1986)

- 円地 文子
- Born: Ueda Fumi (上田 富美); 2 October 1905; Tokyo, Japan
- Died: 12 November 1986 (aged 81); Tokyo, Japan
- Resting place: Yanaka Cemetery, Tokyo, Japan
- Occupations: Writer, playwright
- Writing career
- Notable awards: Women’s Literature Prize (1955, 1966); Noma Literary Prize (1957); Tanizaki Prize (1969); Order of Culture (1985)

Fumiko Ueda (上田 富美, Ueda Fumiko; 2 October 1905 – 12 November 1986), known by her pen name Fumiko Enchi (円地 文子, Enchi Fumiko), was a Japanese writer and playwright known for her explorations into the ideas of sexuality, gender, human identity, and spirituality. She is considered one of the most prominent women writers of Shōwa period Japan.

== Early life ==
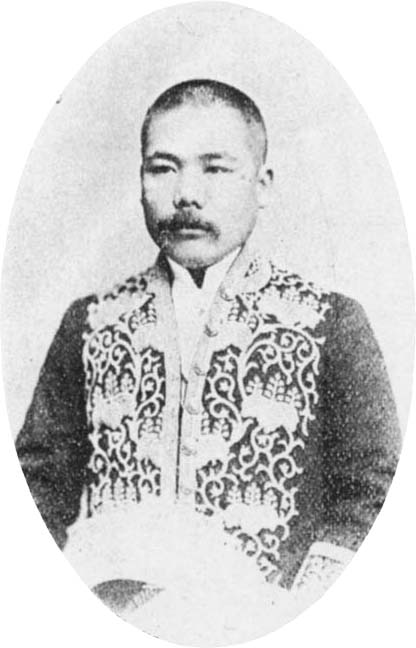
Ueda Kazutoshi, the father of Fumiko Enchi

Fumiko Ueda was born in Asakusa, Tokyo, the second daughter of Tokyo Imperial University linguist and professor Ueda Kazutoshi and his wife Tsuruko. Her father served as president of Kokugakuin University, was a member of the House of Peers, and was later credited with establishing the foundations of modern Japanese linguistics. Her family also included her paternal grandmother Ine, elder brother Hisashi, elder sister Chiyo, as well as maids, houseboys, a wet nurse, and a rickshaw driver and his wife.

Of poor health as a child, she was unable to attend classes in school on a regular basis, so her father decided to keep her at home. She was taught English, French and Chinese literature through private tutors. She was also strongly influenced by her paternal grandmother, who introduced her to the Japanese classics such as The Tale of Genji, as well as to Edo period gesaku novels and to the kabuki and bunraku theater. A precocious child, at age 13, her reading list included the works of Oscar Wilde, Edgar Allan Poe, Kyōka Izumi, Kafū Nagai, Ryūnosuke Akutagawa, and especially Jun'ichirō Tanizaki, whose sado-masochistic aestheticism particularly fascinated her. As a child she also gained access to many rare texts when Basil Hall Chamberlain, a mentor in linguistics to her father, donated his entire library of over eleven thousand books to the family before leaving the country in 1910.

From 1918 to 1922, she attended the girl's middle school of Japan Women's University, but was forced to abandon her studies due to health. However, her interest in the theatre was encouraged by her father, and as a young woman, she attended the lectures of Kaoru Osanai, the founder of modern Japanese drama. Her plays took inspiration from Kaoru Osanai, and many of her later plays focused on revolutionary movements and intellectual conflicts.

== Literary career ==
Her literary career began in 1926, with a one-act stage play Birthplace (ふるさと, Furusato) published in the literary journal Kabuki, which was well received by critics, who noted her sympathies with the proletarian literature movement. This was followed by A Restless Night in Late Spring (晩春騒夜 Banshun sōya), which was published in the September 1928 issue of the magazine Women's Arts (女人芸術, Nyonin Geijutsu) and performed at the Tsukiji Little Theatre in December 1928. In this play, two female artists, Kayoko and Mitsuko, are caught up in a conflict on their different perspectives towards art and politics. This was Enchi's first play to be produced on stage.

In 1930, she married Yoshimatsu Enchi, a journalist with the Tokyo Nichi Nichi Shimbun, with whom she had a daughter. She then began to write fiction but unlike her smooth debut as a playwright, she found it very hard to get her stories published. Although from 1939, the Tokyo Nichi Nichi Shimbun began publishing a serialization of her translation of The Tale of Genji into modern Japanese, her early novels, such as The Words Like the Wind (Kaze no gotoki kotoba, 1939), The Treasures of Heaven and Sea (Ten no sachi, umi no sachi, 1940) and Spring and Autumn (Shunju, 1943) were not a commercial success. She also continued to struggle with her health, having a mastectomy in 1938 after being diagnosed with uterine cancer, and suffering from post-surgical complications.

In 1945, Enchi's home and all her possessions burned during one of the air raids on Tokyo towards the end of the Pacific War. She had a hysterectomy in 1946, and stopped writing till around 1951.

== Postwar success ==
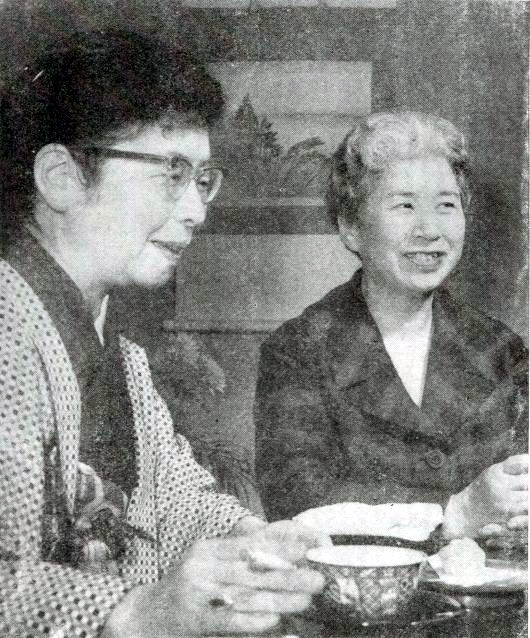
Fumiko Enchi (left) and Motoko Morita (right) in 1960

In 1953, Enchi's novel Days of Hunger (ひもじい月日, Himojii Tsukihi) was received favorably by critics. Her novel is a violent, harrowing tale of family misfortune and physical and emotional deprivation, based partly on wartime personal experiences, and in 1954 won the Women's Literature Prize.

Enchi's next novel was also highly praised: The Waiting Years (女坂, Onna zaka; 1949–1957) won the Noma Literary Prize. The novel is set in the Meiji period and analyzes the plight of women who have no alternative but to accept the role assigned to them in the patriarchal social order. The protagonist is the wife of a government official, who is humiliated when her husband not only takes concubines, but has them live under the same roof as both maids and as secondary wives.

From the 1950s and 1960s, Enchi became quite successful, and wrote numerous novels and short stories exploring female psychology and sexuality. In Masks (Onna men, 1958), her protagonist is based on Lady Rokujō from The Tale of Genji, depicted as a shamanistic character. After losing her son in a climbing accident on Mount Fuji, she manipulates her widowed daughter-in-law to have a son by any means to replace the one she lost. One of the quotes from the book says, "A woman's love is quick to turn into a passion for revenge--an obsession that becomes an endless river of blood, flowing on from generation to generation".

The theme of shamanism and spiritual possession appears repeatedly in Enchi's works in the 1960s. Enchi contrasted the traditions of female subjugation in Buddhism with the role of the female shaman in the indigenous Japanese Shinto religion, and used this as a means to depict the female shaman as a vehicle for either retribution against men, or empowerment for women. In A Tale of False Fortunes (Nama miko monogatari, 1965, also translated as A Tale of False Oracles, literal translation "The Tale of An Enchantress"), a retelling of the Eiga Monogatari (A Tale of Flowering Fortunes), she sets the story in the Heian period, with the protagonist as Empress Teishi (historical figure Fujiwara no Teishi, also known as Sadako), a consort of Emperor Ichijo. The novel won the 1966 Women's Literature Prize. Alongside The Waiting Years and Masks, A Tale of False Fortunes is considered to be her third work to be directly influenced by The Tale of Genji.

Three of her stories were selected for the Tanizaki Prize in 1969: Shu wo ubau mono (朱を奪うもの), Kizu aru tsubasa (傷ある翼) and Niji to shura (虹と修羅).

Another theme in Enchi's writing is eroticism in aging women, which she saw as a biological inequality between men and women. In Saimu (lit. "Coloured Mist", 1976), an aging woman becomes obsessed with a fantasy in which she can revitalize herself through sexual liaisons with young men. Enchi's works combined elements of realism and erotic fantasy, a style that was new at the time.

== Later life and death ==
Enchi was elected to the Japan Art Academy in 1970. She was made a Person of Cultural Merit in 1979, and was awarded the Order of Culture by the Japanese government in 1985 shortly before her death on November 12, 1986, of a heart attack, suffered while she was at a family event in 1986 at her home in the Yanaka neighborhood of Tokyo. Her grave is at the nearby Yanaka Cemetery. Few of Enchi's works have been translated out of Japanese.

== Partial list of works ==
=== Novels ===
- Kaze no gotoki kotoba (lit. "The Words like the Wind", 1939)
- Ten no sachi, umi no sachi (lit. "The Treasures of Heaven and Sea", 1940)
- Shunjū (lit. "Spring and Autumn", 1943)
- The Waiting Years (Onna Zaka, 1949–1957), English translation by John Bester. Kodansha. ISBN 477002889X
- Masks (Onna Men, 1958), English translation by Juliet Winters Carpenter.
- A Tale of False Fortunes (Nama miko monogatari, 1965), English translation by Roger Kent Thomas. University of Hawaii Press. ISBN 0824821874
- Saimu (lit. "Coloured Mist", 1976)

=== One-act plays ===
- Furusato (lit. "Birthplace", 1926)
- Restless Night in Late Spring (Banshu sōya, 1928)

=== Translation ===
- Enchi Genji, a translation of The Tale of Genji into modern Japanese.

== See also ==
- Japanese literature
- List of Japanese authors
