= Masks (novel) =

1958 novel by Fumiko Enchi

Masks (Japanese: 女面, Onnamen) is a novel by Japanese author Fumiko Enchi, published in 1958, however, an English translation by Juliet Winters Carpenter was published in 1983. Each of the novel's three sections takes its name from a type of Noh mask. Many elements of the novel were influenced by The Tale of Genji, which Enchi had earlier translated into modern Japanese.

== Plot summary ==
The novel is split into three sections, each named for a particular noh mask: Ryō no Onna, Masugami and Fukai.

=== Ryō no Onna ===
In a coffee shop on the second floor of Kyoto station, two men, Ibuki and Mikame, discuss their mutual love interest, Yasuko Togano, her relationship with her mother-in-law Mieko and the séance in which the four had participated on the seventeenth of the previous month. The men are old friends from college and Mikame is a bachelor and practicing psychologist, whilst Ibuki is a married university professor with a wife and child. Both Yasuko and Mieko are widowed and although Yasuko's husband Akio was killed in an avalanche on Mount Fuji a year into their marriage, Yasuko chose to stay with her mother-in-law at the Togano house after his death. The four are joined by an intellectual interest in Heian era spirit possession, on the subject of which Yasuko is continuing the research begun by her husband before his death.

Ibuki is invited to join Mikame and the two women on a trip to visit the estate of the ailing noh master, Yorihito Yakushiji, and to see his collection of costumes and masks. Yasuko is particularly disturbed by the “haughty cruelty” of the Zō no Onna mask and is attended by Mikame after experiencing a dizzy spell. The old master has insisted that Mieko and the others see the Ryō no Onna mask, said to represent "the vengeful spirit of an older woman tormented beyond the grave by unrequited love”.

On the train back to Tokyo, Yasuko reveals to Ibuki that her dead husband has a twin sister, Harume, who lives with her and Mieko at the Togano household but was raised away from her brother at the home of her maternal grandparents.

Yasuko demonstrates some inclination of a romantic bent towards Ibuki but signals her intention to marry the bachelor Mikame, for fear that her true feelings are being manipulated by her scheming mother-in-law, Mieko. Ibuki urges Yasuko to get off the train with him and the pair disembark at the seaside resort of Atami, where they spend the night together.

Back in Tokyo, Ibuki receives a call from Mikame, who alerts him to the existence of an old forgotten essay, entitled The Shrine in the Fields, published by Mieko Togano shortly after the outbreak of the Sino-Japanese War in 1937. Ibuki deems the essay, which suggests that the relationship between Genji and Lady Rokujō in The Tale of Genji was far more than a passing affair, bold and somewhat over-defensive, though he finds her hypothesis intriguing. As Ibuki’s wife, Sadako, calls him to bed he asks her if she believes she could be induced to engage in spirit possession but she dismisses the idea as ridiculous.

=== Masugami ===
Yasuko has a nightmare about her husband’s death in an avalanche and is comforted by Mieko, who holds her in an intimate embrace. Yasuko questions Mieko about her intentions for her with regards Ibuki but Mieko attests her innocence, claiming that she only wants to provide for Yasuko’s happiness. Yasuko then turns her attention to the essay The Shrine in the Fields whereupon Mieko reveals that it was intended for her lover who died from a disease contracted at the front after having been conscripted to China. In a further revelation, we learn that this man is in fact the true father of Akio and Harume.

The next morning, it has snowed and Harume is singing a children’s song reminiscent of her childhood in Kanazawa. We learn that she is mentally handicapped, that her mind is like that of a child and that she cannot care for herself. After a banquet dinner that evening, Ibuki returns with Yasuko and Mieko to the Togano household. He finds himself physically drawn to Harume, not yet alert to her disability.

On the way home, Ibuki is intercepted by Mikame, who takes him to the hotel suite he uses for his writing. Mikame tells Ibuki that he has uncovered the truth of Mieko’s past, related to him by her doctor. Before their marriage, Mieko’s husband, Masatsugu, had installed a maid whom he kept as a mistress at the Togano house. The maid, Aguri, had become pregnant on several occasions but Masatsugu had each time insisted on abortion, much to Aguri’s distress and displeasure. Driven by jealousy after his marriage to Mieko, Aguri engineered for Mieko to fall down the stairs, causing her to miscarry several months into her own pregnancy. On another instance, during the New Year's holidays, Mikame visits the Ibuki household where he announces that he has proposed to Yasuko.

One evening, Mieko attends to Harume’s toilette and implores her to faithfully execute her “plan," as of yet unknown to the reader. Mieko rereads an old letter sent to her by her soldier lover, who expresses his delight at having fathered Akio and Harume and his firm conviction that he shall return to Japan, given his status as a non-combatant. Ibuki visits Yasuko at the Togano household, continuing their series of illicit rendez-vous. In the middle of the night he is perturbed to see before him the face of Harume, apparition-like and resembling the Masugami mask of the young madwoman. In the morning, he relates his suspicions to Yasuko, who dismisses them offhand, likening his confused perception of reality to an episode of the Heian era uta monogatari, The Tales of Ise.

=== Fukai ===
Ibuki and Yasuko continue their nocturnal rendez-vous at the Togano household. Meanwhile, Mikame’s courtship of Yasuko continues and their various public outings together inspire Ibuki to jealousy. Sadako visits Mikame at his home to reveal that she has hired a private investigator and has it on good authority that her husband and Yasuko are sleeping together. She denounces the Togano household as a “witches’ den” but is disappointed by Mikame’s lack of reaction when he remains largely unmoved. Sadako further announces that Harume is pregnant, although she does not know who has fathered the child.

Mieko takes Harume, now three months pregnant, to the hospital. The doctor recommends abortion since Harume has a severely retroflexed womb and cannot be expected to survive childbirth. Mieko, however, ignores his advice, for she is intent on continuing her family line and producing a child bearing the same blood as her beloved son, Akio. Ibuki learns of the child he has fathered and, for the first time, of Harume’s mental deficiencies. He once more glimpses Harume, heavy with child, at a temple on the outskirts of Kyoto.

At a meeting of her poetry circle some months later, Mieko is presented with the gift of a noh mask from the old master visited in the first part of the book, now deceased. The mask is Fukai, that of an older woman withered with age and visibly marked by the deep emotions of one well advanced in years. We learn that Harume indeed died of heart failure shortly after the birth as the Togano maid, Yū, and then Yasuko cradle the child in their arms. The novel closes with Mieko reflecting upon the Fukai mask when suddenly she is struck by some unseen, supernatural power.
