= National Screen Service =

The National Screen Service (NSS) was a company that controlled the distribution of theatrical advertising materials in the United States from approximately 1940 through the 1980s. It was located in Englewood, New Jersey.

NSS was formed in 1920 to produce and distribute movie trailers on behalf of movie studios. As time went on, NSS gradually took over production and distribution of other forms of movie advertising, until in the 1940s, it signed exclusive contracts with all the major movie studios to produce and distribute posters and other paper advertising materials.

During the 1980s, as the design of movie theaters changed from small, individual screens to large multiplexes, the amount of advertising space available for a given movie dropped; as a result, the wide variety of movie poster sizes extant until that time was consolidated down to just the "one-sheet" size. As this greatly reduced the need for a separate organization to control poster distribution, movie studios took back those responsibilities, and NSS shrank. Also, NSS faced competition in the policy trailer and snipe business from other producers, namely Filmack and Pike Productions. NSS was eventually bought out by Technicolor, Inc. in September 2000.

National Screen Service established an office in London in 1926. During World War II production was moved to the London suburb of Perivale. In the following decades the team of NSS trailer script writers led by Esther Harris produced trailers for hundreds of feature films made in Britain. NSS also created the main titles, end credits and optical effects, as well as distributing posters, stills and publicity material across the country.

Three directors of the UK subsidiary bought that company from NSS in 1987. Keeping the name National Screen Service UK, it continued to distribute trailers and print publicity material for all major film studios to all UK cinema chains. In 2000, the company was bought by Carlton Communications (later taken over by ITV plc). It was closed in 2007, following increased competition.

== NSS Numbers ==
As part of its inventory management, NSS developed "NSS Stock Numbers", allowing NSS to more easily store and find items for individual films among its shelves. These numbers consisted of a two-digit number representing the year of release, followed by a slash, then a one-to-four digit number assigned to the specific film. If the numbers were preceded by the letter "R", then the poster was from a re-release of the film. One good example is Star Wars; its original release number is "77/21", meaning it was released in the year 1977 and was the 21st movie assigned a stock number for that year. Movie advertising typically had the number in two places: stamped on the back by NSS, and printed in the lower-right corner. The NSS stock number is often mistaken for a "Limited Edition" number.

With the demise of National Screen Service in late 2000, movies no longer receive NSS numbers.
