= Juliet Winters Carpenter =

American translator (1948–2026)

Juliet Winters Carpenter (May 10, 1948 – May 1, 2026) was an American translator of modern Japanese literature. Her translations of fiction and non-fiction have won many awards.

== Early life and education ==
Carpenter was born in Ann Arbor, Michigan, in 1948. She studied Japanese literature at the University of Michigan and the Inter-University Center for Japanese Language Studies in Tokyo. After completing her graduate studies in 1973, she returned to Japan in 1975, where she became involved in translation efforts and teaching.

== Academic career ==
Carpenter was professor emerita at Doshisha Women's College of Liberal Arts in Kyoto and was involved in the Japanese Literature Publishing Project (JLPP), a government-supported project translating and publishing Japanese books overseas.

== Translations ==
Carpenter's translation of Kōbō Abe's novel Secret Rendezvous (密会, Mikkai) won the 1980 Japan-U.S. Friendship Commission Prize for the Translation of Japanese Literature. Her translation of Minae Mizumura's novel A True Novel (本格小説, Honkaku Shōsetsu) won the same award for 2014-2015 and earned numerous other awards including the 2014 Lewis Galantière Award of the American Translators Association. Once Upon a Time in Japan, a book of folk tales which she co-translated with Roger Pulvers, received the 2015 Gelett Burgess Children's Book Award for Best Multicultural Book.

Carpenter won the 2021-2022 Lindsey and Masao Miyoshi Translation Prize for lifetime achievement as a translator of modern Japanese literature, with reference to her translation of Mizumura Minae's An I-Novel (Columbia University Press, 2021). An I-Novel also won the 2019-20 William F. Sibley Memorial Subvention Award for Japanese Translation.

Her translation of The Great Passage by Shion Miura, an audiobook read by Brian Nishii, won the 2017 Golden Earphones Award.

== Music ==
Carpenter was an enthusiast of traditional Japanese music and taught the koto and shamisen.

== Personal life and death ==
Carpenter retired to Whidbey Island in Washington State with her husband Bruce, professor emeritus of Tezukayama University. They had three children. She died on May 1, 2026.

== Translations ==
Title	Author	Type
The Ark Sakura	Abe Kōbō	Novel
Beyond the Curve	Abe Kōbō	Short stories
Secret Rendezvous	Abe Kōbō	Novel
Japanese Women: Short Stories	Yamamoto Shūgorō	
The Hunter	Nonami Asa	Novel
Uncommon Clay	Sidney B. Cardozo and Masaaki Hirano	Essay
Masks	Enchi Fumiko	Novel
The Quickening Field	Hachikai Mimi	Poetry
Biruma	Hiwa Satoko	Poetry
Waiting on the Weather: Making Movies with Akira Kurosawa	NogamiTeruyo	Memoir
Shadow Family	Miyabe Miyuki	Novel
Memories of Wind and Waves: A Self-Portrait of Lakeside Japan	Saga Jun'ichi	Oral history
The Last Shogun: The Life of Tokugawa Yoshinobu	Shiba Ryōtarō	Biography
You Were Born for a Reason	Takamori Kentetsu, Akehashi Daiji, and Itō Kentarō	Buddhist philosophy
Salad Anniversary	Tawara Machi	Tanka
After	Wagō Ryōichi	Poetry
A Lost Paradise	Watanabe Jun'ichi	Novel
The Sail of My Soul	Yamaguchi Seishi	Haiku
Eat Sleep Sit: My Year at Japan's Most Rigorous Zen Temple	Nonomura Kaoru	Memoir
A Cappella	Koike Mariko	Novel
Jasmine	Tsujihara Noboru	Novel
Clouds above the Hill	Shiba Ryōtarō	Historical fiction
A True Novel	Minae Mizumura	Novel
Once Upon a Time in Japan	NHK	Folk tales
An I-Novel	Minae Mizumura	Novel
The Fall of Language in the Age of English	Minae Mizumura	Essay
Inheritance From Mother	Minae Mizumura	Novel
The Great Passage	Miura Shion	Audio Book
Gems of Japanese Literature	Edited by Juliet Winters Carpenter and Yuko Aotani	Anthology
Pax Tokugawana: The Cultural Flowering of Japan, 1603-1853	Haga Tōru	Cultural History
"Kanken,” the Petition of Yamamoto Kakuma: An Annotated Translation	Yamamoto Kakuma	Treatise
The Kidai Shōran Scroll: Tokyo Street Life in the Edo Era	Ozawa Hiromu and Kobayashi Tadashi	Art History
Heritage Culture and Business, Kyoto Style: Craftsmanship and the Creative Economy	Murayama Yuzo	Business
No Longer Human	Osamu Dazai	Novel

== Other works ==
Carpenter was also the author of the book Seeing Kyoto.
