= Next Generation Indie Book Awards =

Largest international awards program for indie authors and independent publishers

- Sponsored by: Independent Book Publishing Professionals Group, Allen O’Shea Literary Agency
- Location: Vancouver, Washington
- Country: United States
- First award: 2007
- Website: www.indiebookawards.com

The Next Generation Indie Book Awards, also known as the Indie Book Awards, is a literary awards program that recognizes and honors authors and publishers of exceptional independently published books in 70 different categories. "Indies" include small presses, larger independent publishers, university presses, e-book publishers, and self-published authors. Established in 2007, it is the largest international awards program for indie authors and independent publishers and is presented by the Independent Book Publishing Professionals Group.

== History ==
The not-for-profit awards program was founded in 2007 by Catherine Goulet and is presented by the Independent Book Publishing Professionals Group in cooperation with co-founder Marilyn Allen of Allen O’Shea Literary Agency. The judges are professionals from the book publishing industry, including literary agents, editors, publishing executives, book reviewers, writing teachers, and authors.

Cash prizes and medals are awarded to winners and finalists ranging from $100 to $1,500, grand prize winners are also awarded a trophy, and the top books in each category are reviewed by literary agents for possible representation. The Next Generation Indie Book Awards are announced each year during BookExpo America in a catalog distributed to BookExpo attendees. Winners and Finalists are honored at a reception during BookExpo America. The awards ceremonies are held at landmark locations in New York City including the Plaza Hotel and the Harvard Club of New York City. In 2016 the ceremony was held at the Newberry Library in Chicago.

The Next Generation Indie Book Awards program has been said to be the 'Sundance' of the book publishing world.

== Recipients ==
Next Generation Indie Book Awards winners
Year	Category	Author	Title	Result
2008	Fiction	Robert Wexelblatt	Zublinka Among Women	First place
2008	Fiction	Janey Bennett	The Pale Surface of Things	Second place
2008	Fiction	Karen M. Black	Moondance	Third place
2008	Nonfiction	Keren Taylor	Lines of Velocity: Words that Move from WriteGirl	First place
2008	Nonfiction	Peter Ressler and Monika Mitchell Ressler	Spiritual Capitalism: How 9/11 Gave us Nine Spiritual Lessons of Work and Business	Second place
2008	Nonfiction	Jonathan B. Wright	Who's Behind the Fairy Doors?	Third place
2009	Fiction	Fairlee Winfield	BUFFALOed	First place
2009	Fiction	Campbell Jefferys	Hunter: A Novel	Second place
2009	Fiction	David Desmond	The Misadventures of Oliver Booth: Life in the Lap of Luxury	Third place
2009	Nonfiction	Russell Leigh Sharman and Cheryl Harris Sharman	Nightshift NYC	First place
2009	Nonfiction	Ken Beller and Heather Chase	Great Peacemakers	Second place
2009	Nonfiction	Suzanne Kamata	Call Me Okaasan: Adventures in Multicultural Mothering	Third place
2010	Fiction	Keith Remer	The Hiding Place of Thunder	First place
2010	Fiction	Michel Bruneau	Shaken Allegiances	Second place
2010	Fiction	K.L. Brady	The Bum Magnet	Third place
2010	Nonfiction	Mary Collins	American Idle: A Journey Through Our Sedentary Culture	First place
2010	Nonfiction	George Stranahan and Nicole Beinstein Strait	Phlogs: Journey to the Heart of the Human Predicament	Second place
2010	Nonfiction	Donna DeNomme and Tina Proctor	Ophelia's Oracle: Discovering the Healthy, Happy, Self-Aware, and Confident Girl in the Mirror	Third place
2011	Fiction	James Hitt	Carny: A Novel in Stories	First place
2011	Fiction	Michael McMenamin and Patrick McMenamin	The DeValera Deception	Second place
2011	Fiction	Bradford Tatum	I Can Only Give You Everything	Third place
2011	Nonfiction	Larry J. Schweiger	Last Chance: Preserving Life on Earth	First place
2011	Nonfiction	Sari Friedman and D. Patrick Miller (Eds.)	Touching: Poems of Love, Longing, and Desire	Second place
2011	Nonfiction	James M. Strock	Serve to Lead: Your Transformational 21st Century Leadership System	Third place
2012	Fiction	Michael McMenamin and Patrick McMenamin	The Parsifal Pursuit	First place
2012	Fiction	Royce Leville	A Little Leg Work	Second place
2012	Fiction	Jean Davies Okimoto	Walter's Muse	Third place
2012	Nonfiction	Jan Thrope	Inner Visions: Grassroots Stories of Truth and Hope	First place
2012	Nonfiction	Matthew Chojnacki	Put the Needle on the Record: The 1980s at 45 Revolutions Per Minute	Second place
2012	Nonfiction	Susan A. Hyatt	Strategy for Good: Business Giving Strategies for the 21st Century	Third place
2013	Fiction	Sara Warner	Still Waters	First place
2013	Fiction	Duff Brenna	Minnesota Memoirs	Second place
2013	Fiction	Michael McMenaminand Patrick McMenamin	The Gemini Agenda	Third place
2013	Nonfiction	John Renesch	The Great Growing Up	First place
2013	Nonfiction	Dr. Ted Eisenberg and Joyce K. Eisenberg	The Scoop on Breasts:A Plastic Surgeon Busts the Myths	Second place
2013	Nonfiction	Ember Reichgott Junge	Zero Chance of Passage: The Pioneering Charter School Story	Third place
2014	Fiction	Minae Mizumura	A True Novel	First place
2014	Fiction	Nina Schuyler	The Translator	Second place
2014	Fiction	Ron MacLean	Headlong	Third place
2014	Nonfiction	John Mitchell	The Boy Who Lived With Ghosts: A Memoir	First place
2014	Nonfiction	David Gottfried	Explosion Green	Second place
2014	Nonfiction	Dianne Maroney	The Imagine Project: Stories of Courage, Hope and Love	Third place
2015	Fiction	Raymond Hutson	Topeka, ma'shuge	First place
2015	Fiction	Christine Sunderland	The Magdalene Mystery	Second place
2015	Fiction	CB Anderson	River Talk	Third place
2015	Nonfiction	Kerry Howley	Thrown	First place
2015	Nonfiction	Joseph Bharat Cornell	The Sky and Earth Touched Me	Second place
2015	Nonfiction	Bonnie U. Gruenberg	The Wild Horse Dilemma: Conflicts and Controversies of the Atlantic Coast Herds	Third place
2016	Fiction	Norma Hinkens	Immurement	First place
2016	Fiction	Dave Riese	Echo from Mount Royal	Second place
2016	Fiction	Dustin Stevens	The Boat Man	Third place
2016	Nonfiction	David Noyes	The Photographing Tourist: A Storyteller's Guide to Travel and Photography	First place
2016	Nonfiction	Joseph Cornell	Sharing Nature: Nature Awareness Activities for All Ages	Second place
2016	Nonfiction	Holly E. Tripp (Ed.)	Stories of Music	Third place
2017	Fiction	Nalini Warriar	Fireflies in the Night	First place
2017	Fiction	Desiree Cooper	Know the Mother	Second place
2017	Fiction	Kimberly Meehan	The Coney Island Hot Dog Heist	Third place
2017	Nonfiction	Jericho Parms	Lost Wax: Essays	First place
2017	Nonfiction	William Seale	Blair House: The President's Guest House	Second place
2017	Nonfiction	Lowell E. Baier	Inside the Equal Access to Justice Act: Environmental Litigation and the Crippling Battle over America's Lands, Endangered Species, and Critical Habitats	Third place
2018	Fiction	Cynthia T. Toney	The Other Side of Freedom	First place
2018	Fiction	Jeanie Kortum	Stones	Second place
2018	Fiction	Stewart Raffill	Rage	Third place
2018	Nonfiction	Jen Townsend and Renée Zettle-Sterling	Cast: Art and Objects Made Using Humanity's Most Transformational Process	First place
2018	Nonfiction	Cynthia O'Brien with Anne Berry (Illus.)	Noname The Feral Cat!	Second place
2018	Nonfiction	Noppadol Paothong and Kathy Love	Sage Grouse, Icon of the West	Third place
2019	Fiction	Laura Hunter	Beloved Mother	First place
2019	Fiction	Robert Gryn	Two Skies Before Night	Second place
2019	Fiction	H.D. Hunter	Torment: A Novella	Third place
2019	Nonfiction	Lois Farfel Stark	The Telling Image: Shapes of Changing Times	First place
2019	Nonfiction	James Tertius deKay Michael Fazio, Osborne Phinizy Mackie, and Katherine Malone-France	The Stephen Decatur House: A History	Second place
2019	Nonfiction	L.S. Gardiner	Tales from an Uncertain World: What Other Assorted Disasters Can Teach Us About Climate Change	Third place
2020	Fiction	Dr. Chelinay Gates (aka Malardy)	Lucky-Child: The Secret	First place
2020	Fiction	L. James Rice	Eve of Snows	Second place
2020	Fiction	Sean Covel with Diego Velasquez (Illus.)	Marlon McDoogle's Magical Night	Third place
2020	Nonfiction	QT Luong	Treasured Lands: A Photographic Odyssey Through America's National Parks	First place
2020	Nonfiction	Debra Rosenman	The Chimpanzee Chronicles: Stories of Heartbreak and Hope from Behind the Bars	Second place
2020	Nonfiction	Daniel Paterna	Feast of the Seven Fishes: A Brooklyn Italian's Recipes Celebrating Food and Family	Third place
2021	Fiction	Beverley Brenna with Tara Anderson (Illus.)	Sapphire the Great and the Meaning of Life	First place
2021	Fiction	April White	Death's Door	Second place
2021	Fiction	Meera Ekkanath Klein	Seeing Ceremony: A Novel with Recipes	Third place
2021	Nonfiction	Nina Ansary with Petra Dufkova (Illus.)	Anonymous Is a Woman: A Global Chronicle of Gender Inequality	First place
2021	Nonfiction	Max Wisshak and Stefanie Wisshak	New Zealand Karst - A voyage across limestone landscapes into the subterranean realm of caves	Second place
2021	Nonfiction	Adam Schrager (Project Director), Nyra Jordan (Designer), and Ian Chalgren (Eds.)	Let's Talk About It - The Art, the Artists and the Racial Justice Movement on Madison's State Street	Third place
2022	Fiction	Sissel Waage with Ana-Maria Cosma (Illus.)	The ForestGirls, with the World Always	First place
2022	Fiction	Gayle Gonsalves	My Stories Have No Endings	Second place
2022	Fiction	Reid Lance Rosenthal and Jennifer Unflat (Senior Publisher’s Assistant)	Threads West Series, Books 1-4	Third place
2022	Nonfiction	Jane Marshall (author) with Harriet Sheffer (Illus.)	The Naked Truth About Breast Cancer	First place
2022	Nonfiction	Tameka Ellington and Sophie Friederich (Illus.)	Textures: The History and Art of Black Hair	Second place
2022	Nonfiction	Kenneth Anand and Jared Goldstein	Sneaker Law: All You Need to Know About the Sneaker Business	Third place
2023	Fiction	Rick Steber	Out Killing Indians	First place
2023	Fiction	Rhona Weaver	A Sacred Duty: An FBI Yellowstone Adventure	Second place
2023	Fiction	Andrée Jannette	The Tea Drinker’s Guide to Adventure	Third place
2023	Nonfiction	Alice Brittan	Gifts and Grace	First place
2023	Nonfiction	Lynne Heasley and Glenn Wolff (Illus.)	The Accidental Reef and Other Ecological Odysseys in the Great Lakes	Second place
2023	Nonfiction	Kimberlee Yolanda Williams	Dear White Woman, Please Come Home: Hand Me Your Bias, and I’ll Show You Our Connection	Third place
2024	Fiction	Rae Bridgman	Good Night, Good Night, Victoria Beach	First place
2024	Fiction	Brooke Shaffner	Country of Under	Second place
2024	Fiction	Jared Acuña	All Battles End at Sunset	Third place
2024	Nonfiction	Christa Bruhn	Crossing Borders: The Search For Dignity in Palestine	First place
2024	Nonfiction	Tae-hyok Kim and Nicole Kim Rogers	Beyond the Border: A Korean’s Journey Between the North and South	Second place
2024	Nonfiction	Dawn Brockett	Unrestricted: How I Stepped Off the Tightrope, Learned to Say No, and Silenced Anorexia	Third place
2025	Fiction	Mark Mustian	Boy With Wings	First place
2025	Fiction	Lily Guzman with Dorota Rewerenda (Illus.)	Gentle Hugs	Second place
2025	Fiction	Peta-Gaye Nash	Told Ya! Stories	Third place
2025	Nonfiction	James Kilgore (author) with Vic Liu (Illus.)	The Warehouse: A Visual Primer on Mass Incarceration	First place
2025	Nonfiction	James Neil Barnes	Cherokee History and the Spirit Family	Second place
2025	Nonfiction	Sharon Podobnik	It’s Not (All) Your Fault: Self-Help and the Individualization of Oppression	Third place
2026	Fiction	Brenda K. Thompson	Alice Anyway	First place
2026	Fiction	Terry Lee Caruthers	Red And Me	Second place
2026	Fiction	J.A. Hoskins	Writer-in-Residence	Third place
2026	Nonfiction	Terry Blade	Of Bloodlines and Blue Notes: Lyrics, Album Notes and Critical Essays	First place
2026	Nonfiction	Ivan Mikolji	Flora of the Orinoco: Aquatic and Semi-Aquatic Plants	Second place
2026	Nonfiction	Michael A. Carson, Matthew A. Carson, Shenika H. Carson	African-American Women Who Began A Movement: 100 Visionaries of Freedom, Justice, and Equality	Third place
