= Key art =

Advertising artwork repeated across media

Key art, also known as key visual, is the artwork which is repeated across media such as posters, print, television and digital advertisements, streaming or download thumbnails, and game or film DVD/Blu-Ray box covers.

Key visuals are defined in the field of media studies as "functional equivalents to keywords" that "emerge, or... are strategically produced and distributed... and considered worth being archived, remembered, called for and used as a major element in (audio-) visual horizons of actions and means of co-ordination or (ex-)communication for some time."

Key art is most commonly understood as advertising for entertainment media such as films, television and video games.

== Film ==
The term key art was defined by The Hollywood Reporter (who awarded the annual Key Art Awards, founded in 1972) as “the singular, iconographic image that is the foundation upon which a movie’s marketing campaign is built.” Nicole Purcell, the president of Clio (who incorporated the Key Art Awards into their own awards in 2011), explained that key art was historically understood to be movie posters, but has expanded especially due to the influence of digital media.

In 2005, key art from The Silence of the Lambs and The Shining were voted to be the most iconic key art of the previous 35 years.

Key art is often shaped by contracts with actors, directors and others, and so post-release adjustments to advertising can be limited by these contractual agreements.

== Television ==
Unlike book art and film posters, television key art is horizontal and is most often produced at 16:9 ratio.

Netflix state that their research indicates that people focus on key art for 1.8 seconds, and that such artwork is the biggest influence upon their viewers' decisions to engage with content. Netflix key art is currently thumbnail- rather than design-based, as artwork is shaped by user activities and demographics, and built by algorithms extracting screenshots from video.

== Video games ==
In video games, key art is produced earlier and helps to convey a vision of the game to the team of artists working to develop it, as well as then being used in advertising and on box art.
