= Minae Mizumura =

Japanese writer

- 水村美苗
- Born: 1951 (age 74–75); Tokyo, Japan
- Education: Yale University
- Occupation: Writer
- Writing career
- Language: Japanese
- Genre: Fiction
- Notable works: Zoku meian; Shishosetsu from left to right; Honkaku shosetsu
- Notable awards: MEXT Award for New Artists; Noma Literary New Face Prize; Yomiuri Prize
- Website: Official website

Minae Mizumura (水村 美苗, Mizumura Minae; born 1951) is a Japanese novelist. Among other literary awards, she has won the Noma Literary New Face Prize and the Yomiuri Prize.

== Early life ==
Born into a middle-class family in Tokyo, she moved to Long Island, New York at the age of twelve. Her years of reading and re-reading European literature during her childhood in post war Japan, and modern Japanese literature while attending American high school, later became the foundation for her novels. After studying studio art at the School of the Museum of Fine Arts in Boston and French at Sorbonne in Paris, she went on to Yale College, majoring in French. While still a student at Yale Graduate School, she published a critical essay, "Renunciation", (Note: "Renunciation", Yale French Studies, no. 69 (1985), pp. 81–97. doi:10.2307/2929926.) on the writing of the literary critic Paul de Man upon his death. It was noticed as a precursor to later studies on de Man's work and launched her writing career.

== Career ==
Her first novel, Light and Darkness Continued, a sequel to Natsume Sōseki's unfinished classic, and her second, An I Novel From Left to Right, a fictionalized autobiography, were first serialized in quarterly journals edited by the literary critic Kojin Karatani. Her third, A True Novel, a re-telling of Emily Brontë's Wuthering Heights in postwar Japan, was first serialized in the monthly literary journal Shinchō. It was translated into English in 2013.

Mizumura has taught at Princeton University, the University of Michigan and Stanford University. She was a resident novelist in the International Writing Program at the University of Iowa in 2003. She won the 1991 Agency for Cultural Affairs New Artist Award, the 1996 Noma New Artist Award, and the 2003 Yomiuri Prize for Literature. Minae Mizumura now resides in Tokyo, Japan.

== Writing style ==
She is often portrayed as a novelist who questions the conventional boundaries of national literature. Her novels include Light and Darkness Continued, An I Novel from left to right, and A True Novel, which has been selected for the Japanese Literature Publishing Project, a national program to promote translations of Japanese literature. She also writes essays and literary criticism in major newspapers and journals. Many of Minae Mizumura's works have been described as highly readable and often entertaining, while, at the same time, resonating with historical significance. They are also known for their formalistic innovations, such as making use of unusual printing formats and inserting English texts and photographic illustrations. Because she returned to Japan as an adult and chose to write in Japanese despite her coming of age in the United States and her education in English, critics have often noted her particular love for the language and her commitment to Japanese literature. Her analysis and observations on the demise of Japanese, detailed in her book of criticism titled The Fall of Language in the Age of English, gained much attention from the mainstream media as well as the Internet. In the same book, she wrote of the significance of preserving the great literary tradition established during the time of building modern Japan.

== English translations ==
- The Fall of Language in the Age of English, translated by Mari Yoshihara and Juliet Winters Carpenter, Columbia University Press
- A True Novel, translated by Juliet Winters Carpenter, Other Press
- Inheritance from Mother, translated by Juliet Winters Carpenter, Other Press
- An I-Novel, translated by Juliet Winters Carpenter in collaboration with the author, Columbia University Press, March 2021

== Awards and honors ==
- 1991 41st MEXT Award for New Artists
- 1995 17th Noma Literary New Face Prize
- 2003 54th Yomiuri Prize (FY2002)
- 2014 Best Translated Book Award, one of two runners-up for A True Novel, translated from the Japanese by Juliet Winters Carpenter
- 2025 Person of Cultural Merit

== Works ==
- Light and Darkness Continued (Zoku Meian), (ISBN 4101338116) 1990.
- An I Novel from Left to Right (Shishosetu from left to right), (ISBN 4480425853) 1995.
- Letters with Bookmarks Attached (Tegami, Shiori wo Soete), (ISBN 4022642718) 1998.
- A True Novel, (in two volumes ISBN 4-10-133813-2 ISBN 4101338140) 2002.
- The Fall of the Japanese Language in the Age of English (Nihongo ga Horobiru Toki – Eigo no Seiki no Nakade), Chikuma Shobo, (ISBN 4480814965) 2008.
- Reading in the Japanese Language (Nihongo wo Yomutoiukoto), Chikuma Shobo, (ISBN 9784480815019) 2009.
- Writing in the Japanese Language (Nihongo wo Kakutoiukoto), Chikuma Shobo, (ISBN 9784480815026) 2009.
