= Boris Grinsson =

Russian-born French poster designer

- Born: 1907; Pskov, Russia
- Died: 1999 (aged 91–92)
- Occupations: Artist, Film poster artist
- Notable work: Over 2000 French film posters

Boris Grinsson (1907 in Pskov, Russia – 1999) was an artist famous for drawing the designs for over 2000 French film posters.

Fleeing Russia after the Bolshevik takeover, Grinsson's family settled in Estonia, where he studied art in Tartu. Moving to Berlin to use his skills, he found work at the UFA Studio designing film posters. His drawing of an anti-Hitler election poster in 1932 led him to flee Germany to Paris after Hitler took power.
