= Fact sheet =

Data presentation format

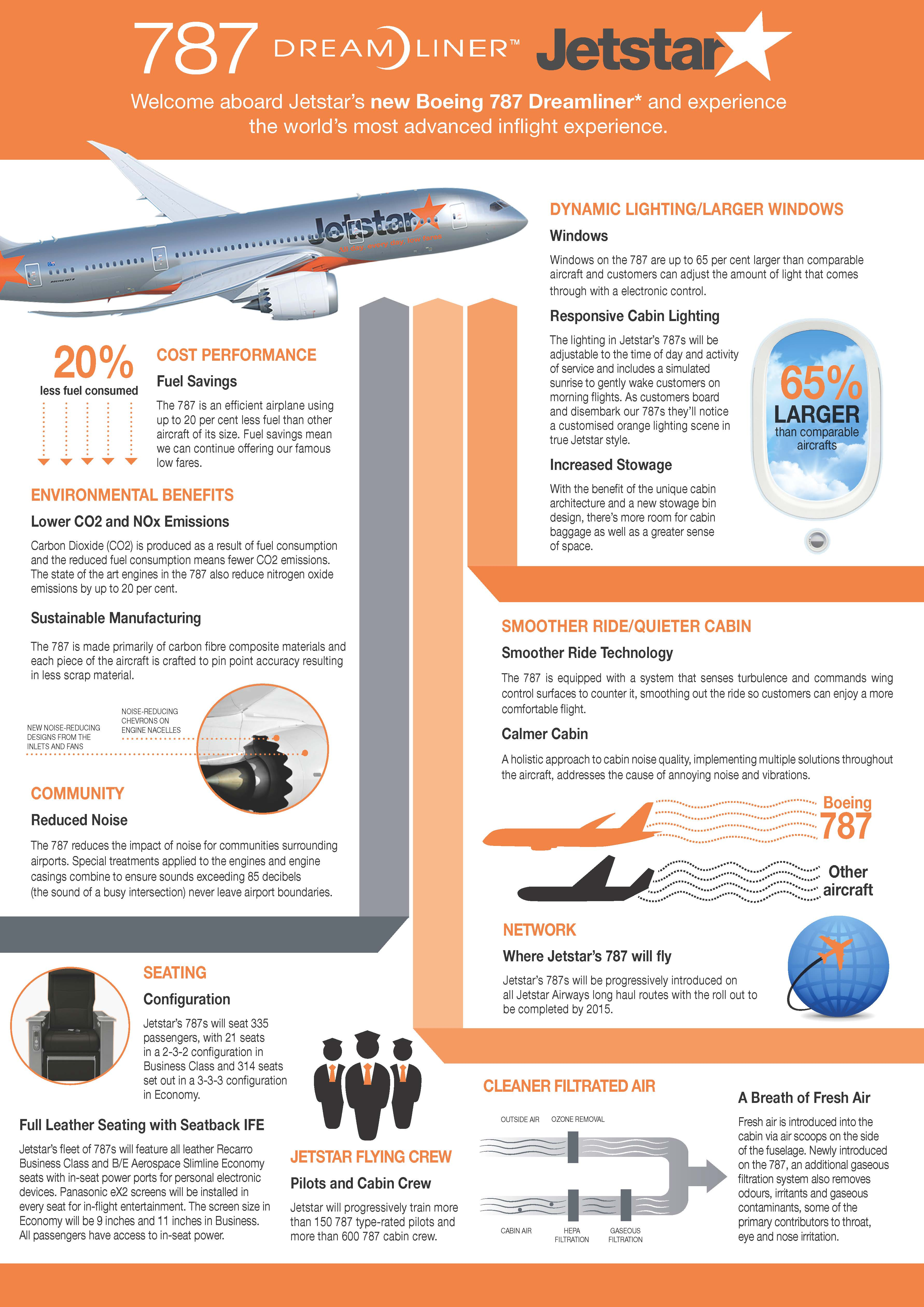
Jetstar Boeing 787 fact sheet

A factsheet or fact sheet, also called fact file, is a single-page document containing essential information about a product, substance, service or other topic. Factsheets are frequently used to provide information to an end user, consumer or member of the public in concise, simple language. They generally contain key safety points, operating instructions or basic information about a topic depending on the purpose of the fact sheet.

== Typical contents ==
Factsheets frequently make use of elements such as lists, tables and diagrams to convey meaning quickly and effectively. The language and content of a factsheet depend on its target audience; a factsheet aimed at professional engineers may use more technical language than one aimed at an end-user.

== History ==
Factsheets were traditionally printed and physically distributed, often included in the packaging of a product. Many manufacturers now provide digital factsheets as well as or instead of paper-and-ink documents.

== Examples ==
- The World Health Organization provides fact sheets on wide range of health issues
- The US National Aeronautics and Space Administration provides planetary fact sheets.
- The US conservation organization Defenders of Wildlife provides fact sheets about animals.
- The World Factbook, a collection from the US Central Intelligence Agency of tabular factsheets on various countries.
- The Federal Republic of Germany has published a fact sheet on the unique dual vocational training system.

== See also ==
- Brochure
- Executive summary
- Infobox
- Infographic
- One sheet
- Press release
- Public relations
