= Secret Rendezvous (novel) =

1977 novel by Kōbō Abe

- Author: Kōbō Abe
- Original title: 密会
- Language: Japanese
- Published: 1977
- Publication place: Japan

Secret Rendezvous (密会, Mikkai) is a 1977 novel by Kōbō Abe. The English translation by Juliet Winters Carpenter was published by Knopf on August 27, 1979.

== Plot ==
In the middle of the night, an ambulance arrives to take away a woman who appears to be completely healthy. Her husband, a sales representative for an athletic shoe company, attempts to track her whereabouts the next morning, but can find no trace of her once he arrives at the hospital.
