= The Waiting Years =

1957 novel by Fumiko Enchi

- Author: Fumiko Enchi
- Original title: 女坂
- Publication date: 1957
- Awards: Noma Prize

The Waiting Years (originally published under the title 女坂 Onnazaka) is a novel by Fumiko Enchi, set within the milieu of an upper-class Japanese family in the last years of the 19th century. It was first published in 1957 and won the Noma Prize. An English translation, by John Bester, has been published by Kodansha. The novel is primarily set in the district of Asakusa and Fukushima Prefecture.
