= Key Art Awards 2006 =

The Key Art Awards were an annual collection of honors given for outstanding achievement in artwork and other promotional materials advertising movies. The awards are sponsored by The Hollywood Reporter, a trade paper published for the entertainment production community.

The 36th Key Art Awards:

== Winners ==
- Best of Show - Audiovisual (tie):
  - Little Children
  - Thank You For Smoking
- Best of Show - Print:
  - Little Miss Sunshine
- Best Posters:
  - Action/Adventure:
    - V for Vendetta
  - Animation:
    - Ice Age: The Meltdown
  - Comedy:
    - Little Miss Sunshine
  - Documentary:
    - An Inconvenient Truth
  - Drama:
    - Hard Candy
  - Horror:
    - The Descent
  - International:
    - Paris, je t'aime (Paris, I Love You)
  - Teaser:
    - Crank
- Best Theatrical Trailers:
  - Action/Adventure:
    - Casino Royale
  - Comedy:
    - Thank You for Smoking
  - Documentary:
    - An Inconvenient Truth
  - Drama:
    - Little Children
  - Horror:
    - The Hills Have Eyes
- Best TV Spots:
  - Action/Adventure:
    - X-Men: The Last Stand
  - Comedy:
    - Scary Movie 4
  - Documentary:
    - An Inconvenient Truth
  - Drama:
    - Little Children
  - Horror:
    - When a Stranger Calls
- Best Theatrical Trailers & TV Spots:
  - Animation:
    - Cars
  - International:
    - Casino Royale

== Nominees ==
- Best Posters:
  - Action/Adventure:
    - Crank
    - Superman Returns
    - Poseidon
    - Apocalypto
    - V for Vendetta
  - Animation:
    - A Scanner Darkly
    - Renaissance
    - Ice Age: The Meltdown
    - Monster House
    - Cars
  - Comedy:
    - Borat
    - Little Miss Sunshine
    - Nacho Libre
    - Running with Scissors
    - Thank You for Smoking
  - Documentary:
    - The U.S. vs. John Lennon
    - Deliver Us From Evil
    - An Inconvenient Truth
    - Sketches of Frank Gehry
    - Dave Chappelle's Block Party
  - Drama:
    - Clean
    - Hard Candy
    - Little Children
    - El laberinto del fauno (Pan's Labyrinth)
    - Perfume
  - Horror:
    - The Descent
    - The Hills Have Eyes
    - Pulse
    - Saw III (Blood)
    - Saw III (Teeth)
  - International:
    - The Black Dahlia
    - Borat: Teaser #2
    - Borat: Teaser #1
    - The Prestige
    - Paris, je t'aime
  - Teaser:
    - Borat
    - Crank
    - Hostel
    - Madea's Family Reunion
    - V for Vendetta
- Best Trailers & TV Spots:
  - Animation:
    - Cars
    - Barnyard
    - Monster House
    - Over the Hedge
    - Happy Feet
  - International:
    - Blood Diamond
    - Candy
    - Casino Royale
    - The Departed
    - The Host
