= Ringover =

French communication software company

- Type: Private
- Industry: Telecommunications, Cloud Communications
- Founded: 2005
- Founders: Jean-Samuel Najnudel, Renaud Charvet
- Headquarters: Paris, France
- Key people: Ludovic Rateau (CEO), Jean-Samuel Najnudel (Chairman), Renaud Charvet (CEO, Ringover Inc.)
- Website: www.ringover.com

Ringover is a cloud-based communication software company headquartered in Paris, France. The company provides voice over IP (VoIP), contact center as a service (CCaaS), and artificial intelligence-powered tools for customer engagement and sales teams. Ringover operates offices in Paris, Atlanta, Barcelona, and London.

== History ==
Ringover was originally founded in 2005 by Jean-Samuel Najnudel and Renaud Charvet. The company’s early developments included services like Monfax and Simplicitel. In 2018, Ringover relaunched with a focus on CCaaS, using WebRTC technology to deliver integrated business telephony solutions.

== Funding ==
In 2021, Ringover raised $12 million in a Series A funding round led by Expedition Growth Capital. A supplementary €5 million was secured later that year with support from Bpifrance.

In 2023, the company closed a Series B funding round of €20 million, led by Bpifrance, Orange Ventures, and Expedition Growth Capital.

== Products and services ==
Ringover offers cloud-based solutions designed for customer service and sales operations:

=== CCaaS ===
Launched in 2018, Ringover’s Contact Center as a Service (CCaaS) platform allows companies to manage voice, video, SMS, and messaging communications from a single interface.

=== Cadence ===
Cadence is a sales automation tool by Ringover that helps teams create multi-channel outreach sequences via phone, email, SMS, and LinkedIn.

=== Empower ===
Empower uses artificial intelligence to monitor and analyze sales conversations, applying sentiment analysis to identify interaction quality and performance indicators.

=== Simless ===
In 2025, Ringover launched Simless, a mobile communication solution that integrates Ringover's features into SIM and eSIM technology.

=== Acquisition of Target First ===
In April 2025, Ringover acquired French chatbot company Target First, expanding its product suite to include automated customer service solutions.

== Recognition ==
Ringover has received multiple High Performer awards from the G2 platform in categories including VoIP, support for small businesses, and European telephony solutions.

== See also ==
- VoIP
- Sentiment analysis
