= Association for Japanese Literary Studies =

North American academic organization

The Association for Japanese Literary Studies is an academic organization based in North America devoted to the study of Japanese literature from all periods. It is the only society in North America dedicated solely to the study of Japanese literature. Founded originally as the Midwest Association for Japanese Literary Studies in 1992 by Eiji Sekine, the organization expanded to be national and then international in scope. In 1999, the organization was renamed the "Association for Japanese Literary Studies." Every year, the organization holds a conference on a theme of interest to the membership. The organization also publishes the journal Proceedings of the Association for Japanese Literary Studies (PAJLS), ISSN (1531-5533), indexed by the Modern Language Association.
