= Mari Yoshihara =

American academic (born 1968)

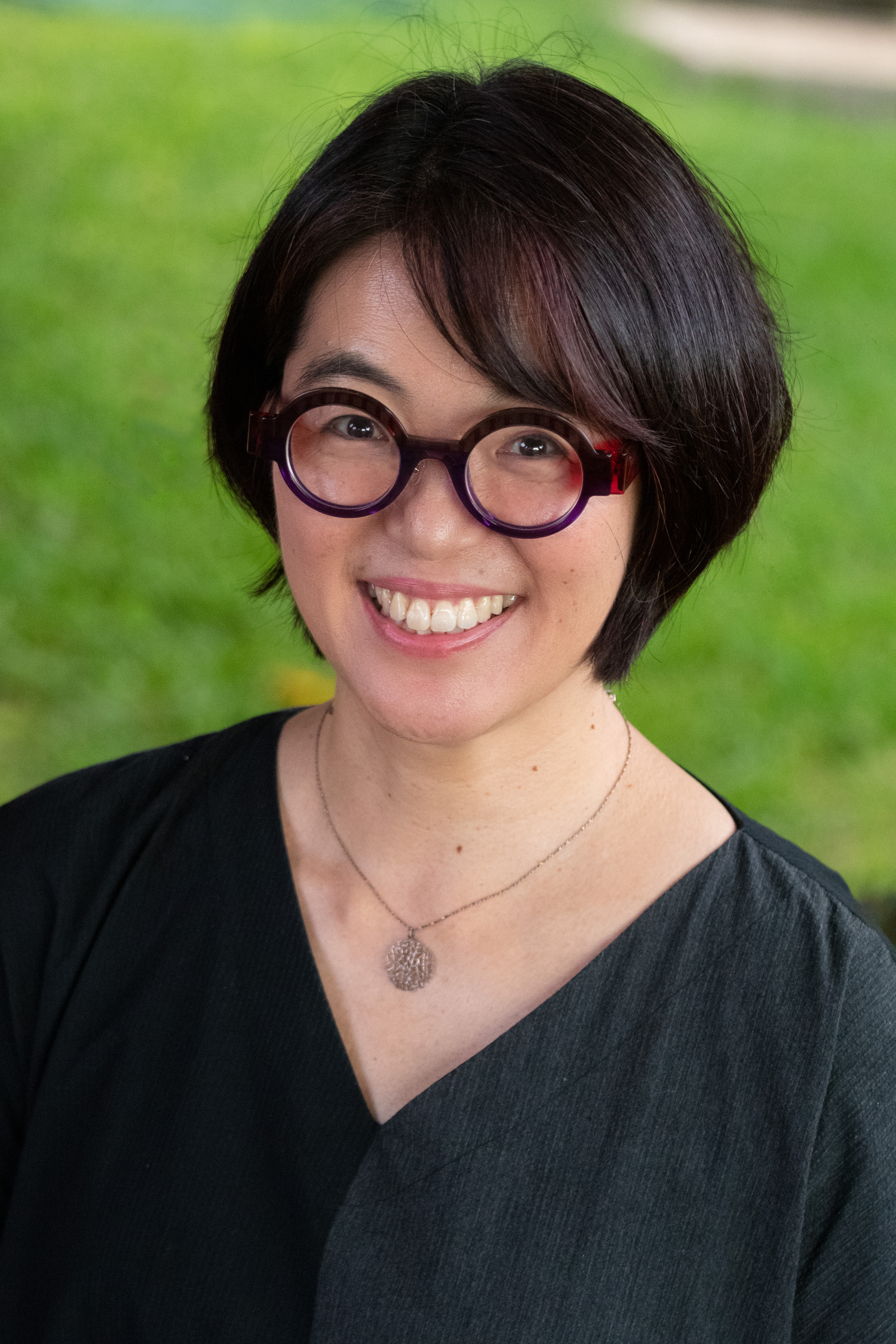
- Yoshihara at the Bishop Museum in 2022
- Born: May 28, 1968; New York City
- Alma mater: University of Tokyo; Brown University
- Occupation: University teacher, pianist
- Employer: University of Hawaiʻi System

Mari Yoshihara (吉原真里, Yoshihara Mari; born May 28, 1968) is an American academic. She is a professor of American Studies at the University of Hawaii at Manoa, and specializes in American cultural history and US-Asian relations. She is also an amateur pianist.

== Biography ==
Yoshihara was born in New York City and grew up in Tokyo. She attended high school in Yokohama and graduated from the University of Tokyo before earning a master's degree and doctorate from Brown University. Yoshihara has taught at the University of Hawai'i at Mānoa since 1997 and served as chief editor of the journal American Quarterly from 2014 to 2024.

She played the piano since the age of three, but took a break from playing while in graduate school. As an adult, she has entered competitions like the Van Cliburn International Piano Competition as an amateur, and won in the 2014 Aloha International Piano Festival's amateur division.

Since 2024, Yoshihara has also assumed a position as Professor at the Center for Global Education at the University of Tokyo, and splits her time between Hawaiʻi and Japan.

== Selected bibliography ==
- Yoshihara, Mari (2003). Embracing the East : white women and American orientalism. Oxford: Oxford University Press. ISBN 9780198033233. OCLC 57365434.
- Yoshihara, Mari (2007). Musicians from a different shore : Asians and Asian Americans in classical music. Philadelphia: Temple University Press. ISBN 9781592133345. OCLC 233003149.
- Yoshihara, Mari (2019). Dearest Lenny: Letters from Japan and the Making of the World Maestro. New York: Oxford University Press. ISBN 9780190465780
