= One sheet =

Document type in the entertainment industry

In the entertainment industry, a one sheet (or one-sheet) is a single document that summarizes a product for publicity and sales.

== Cinema ==
In 1909, the one sheet was introduced and standardized by Thomas Edison's Motion Picture Patents Company, and was printed via lithography. Size was typically 27 by 41 inches (69 × 104 cm) of film poster advertising before 1985 and 27 by 40 inches (69 × 102 cm) as of 1985. Multiple one-sheets are used to assemble larger advertisements, which are referred to by their sheet count, including 24-sheet billboards, and 30-sheet billboards. The term is also used as synonym for the poster artwork and the film poster itself. Since a one sheet is used in the official advertising for a film, they are prized by both collectors of memorabilia for specific films and of film posters themselves. Film posters sold in general retail are in poster size, 24 by 36 inches (61 cm × 91 cm). Prior to 1985, the majority of film posters sent to cinemas were folded before mailing, although, on rare occasions, they were instead rolled and shipped in tubes. While today there are several ways to eliminate these fold lines, many purists prefer film posters in their used conditions.

== Music ==
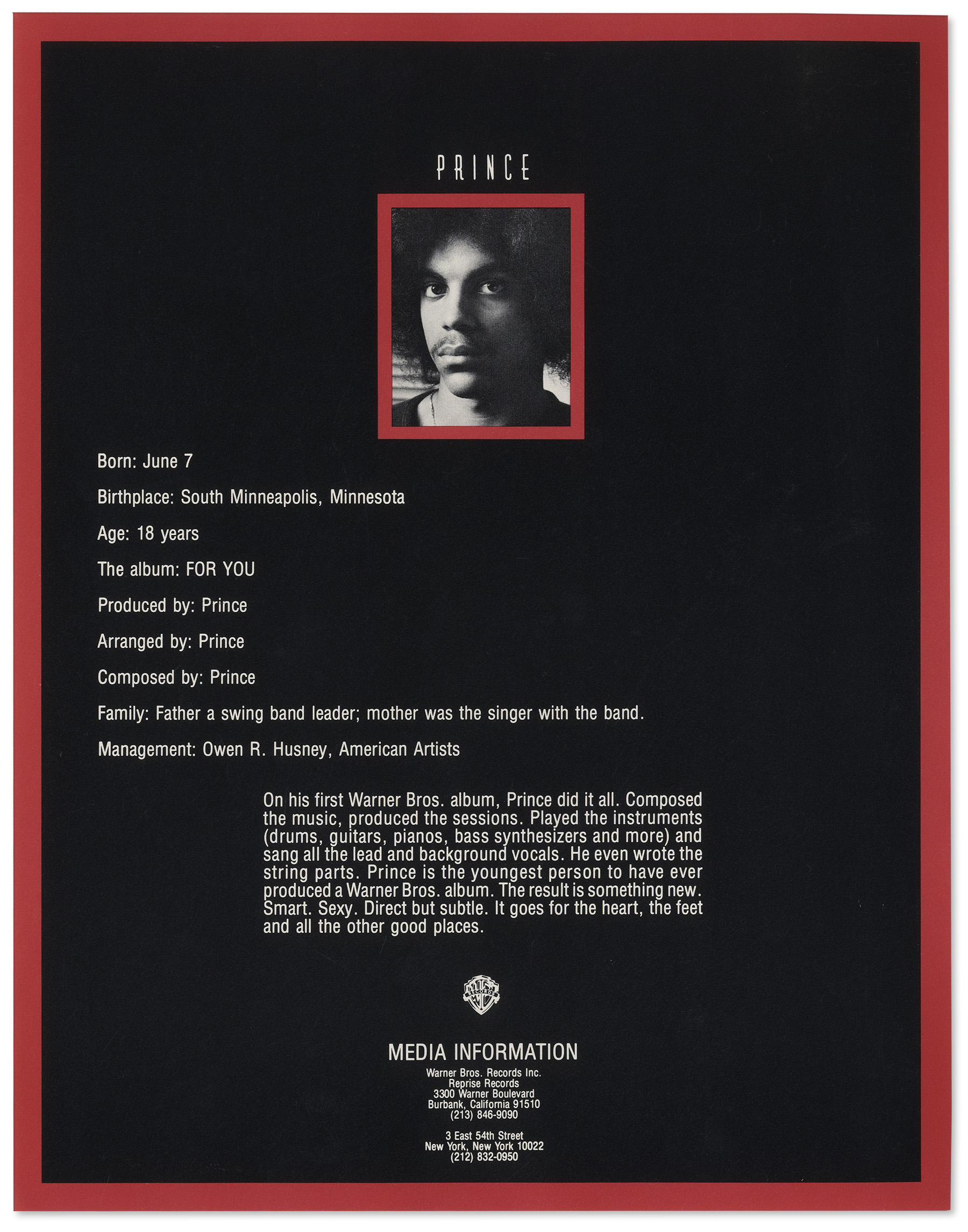
The one sheet published by Warner Bros. Records to promote Prince's 1978 debut album For You

In music publicity and distribution, a one sheet is exactly what the name implies: one sheet of paper, on which information is provided about the musician and/or a specific release which is being distributed. One sheets often accompany a record or CD when it is being shipped to radio stations and music publications (i.e., magazines, web-based forums, etc.). A one sheet is sometimes also referred to as a press sheet, Artist One-Sheet, or a promo sheet.

=== Layout and content ===
Depending on the purpose it serves, a one sheet will often contain a variety of information about its subject. Often comprising both images and text, one sheets typically serve as a way to introduce the unfamiliar reader to a particular artist. The name of the artist (and perhaps the title of the release) will appear prominently. Some common elements found on a one-sheet can include:

- Logo
- Biographical information
- Photograph(s) of the artist
- Cover artwork for the release
- Names of the stronger, more representative tracks
- Names of tracks that might be in violation of U.S. Federal Communications Commission (FCC) guidelines (for radio airplay)
- List of similar artists
- Contact information for the artist, record label, or distributor
- Planned retail release date

== See also ==
- Fact sheet
