= List of awards and nominations received by Terry Blade =

Awards and nominations of American multimedia artist

Terry Blade awards and nominations
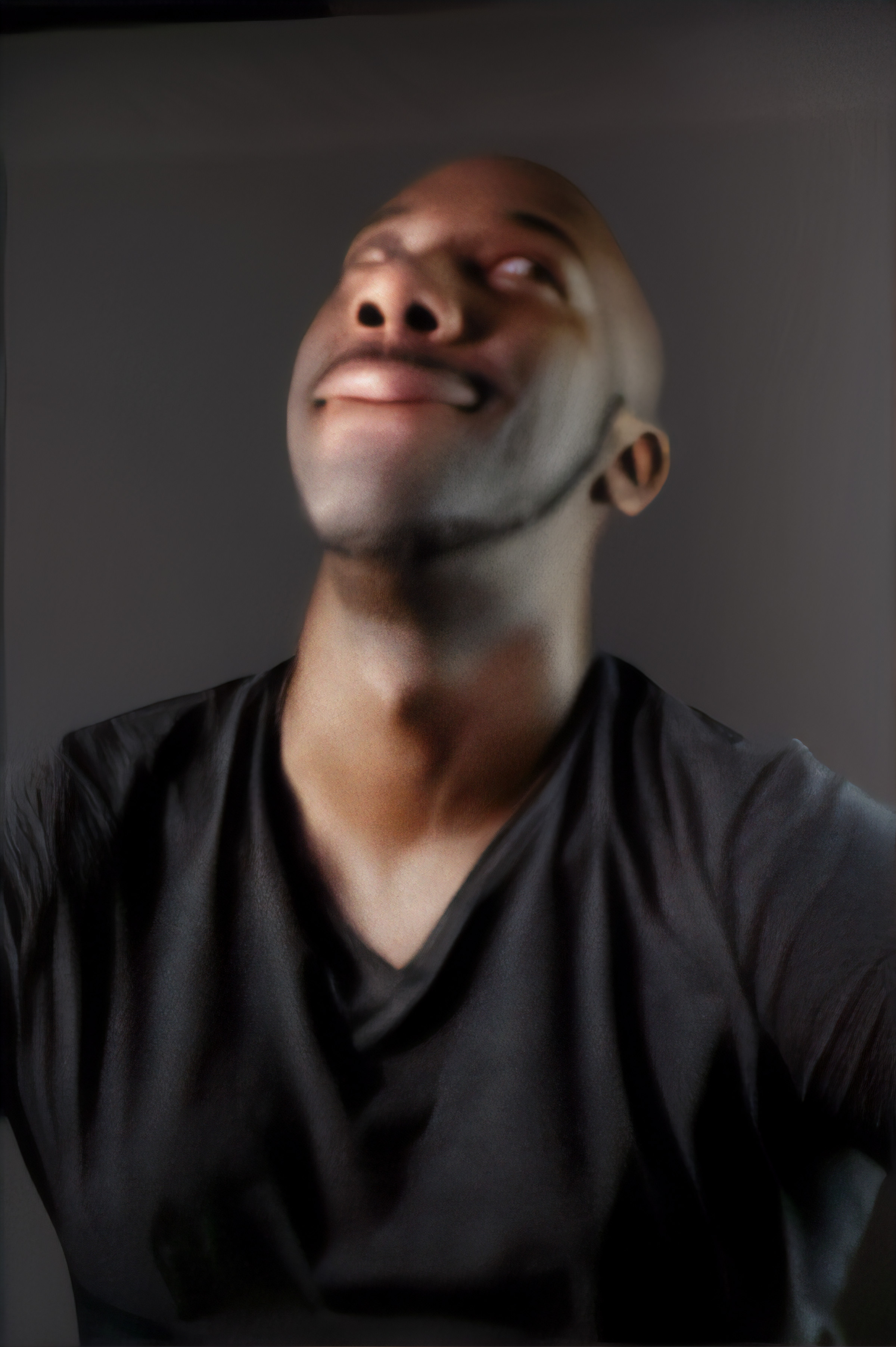
Awards and nominations
Award	Wins	Nominations
American Songwriter Contest	1	0
Animaze Montreal International Film Festival	0	1
Anthem Awards	1	0
Australian Effects & Animation Festival	1	0
Bare Bones International Film Festival	1	0
Bengaluru International Short Film Festival	0	1
Berlin Commercial Festival	0	14
Berlin Music Video Awards	0	1
Bloody Horror International Film Festival	1	0
Blues Blast Music Awards	0	1
Burbank International Film Festival	0	1
Cannes Corporate Media & TV Awards	1	0
Chelsea Film Festival	0	1
Clio Music Awards	2	0
Creative Review Annual Awards	0	1
Cresta International Advertising Awards	1	0
CSS Design Awards	6	0
Digiday Greater Good Awards	0	2
Epica Awards	0	1
Focus Wales Film Festival	0	1
Graphis	2	0
Harvard Divinity School	0	1
Hollywood Independent Music Awards	0	1
Hollywood Music in Media Awards	0	2
International Acoustic Music Awards	1	0
International Design Awards	2	0
Josie Music Awards	0	3
Leeds International Film Festival	0	1
London Fashion Film Festival	0	3
Los Angeles Shorts International Film Festival	0	1
Lusca Fantastic Film Fest	0	1
Massimadi: Afro LGBTQ+ Film and Arts Festival	0	1
Melbourne WebFest	1	0
Midwest Film Festival	1	0
Mill Valley Film Festival	0	1
Moondance International Film Festival	2	0
Monster Fest	0	1
New York Festivals Radio Awards	1	0
Next Generation Indie Book Awards	3	0
Odense International Film Festival	0	1
Oslo/Fusion International Film Festival	0	1
Prague Independent Film Festival	1	0
Reeling: The Chicago LGBTQ+ International Film Festival	0	1
Regina International Film Festival and Awards	0	1
Renaissance Film Festival	1	3
Roxbury International Film Festival	0	1
San Luis Obispo International Film Festival	0	1
Sarajevo Fashion Film Festival	1	0
Short Sweet Film Fest	1	0
Shorty Impact Awards	2	0
Sidewalk Film Festival	0	2
Summit International Awards	6	0
The One Club Awards Denver	3	0
The One Show Awards	1	0
Tribeca Festival	0	1
UK Film Festival	0	1
Unsigned Only Music Awards	4	0
Vienna Independent Film Festival	1	0
World Music & Independent Film Festival	1	0

Totals (Note: Certain award groups do not simply award one winner. They acknowledge several different recipients, have runners-up, and have third place. Since this is a specific recognition and is different from losing an award, runner-up mentions are considered wins in this award tally. For simplification and to avoid errors, each award in this list has been presumed to have had a prior nomination.)
- Wins: 50
- Nominations: 54

The following is a list of awards and nominations received by American multidisciplinary artist Terry Blade.

His award-winning projects include Chicago Kinfolk: The Juke Joint Blues, which received Gold and Bronze awards at the 2026 Clio Music Awards; Mimesis, which received Silver at the Australian Effects & Animation Festival; and the trailer for My Gender Is Black, which received Gold at the Cannes Corporate Media & TV Awards.

In literature, his book Of Bloodlines and Blue Notes: Lyrics, Album Notes and Critical Essays won the nonfiction grand prize at the 2026 Next Generation Indie Book Awards. His music video Won't Be Around was also selected for the 2024 Tribeca Festival.

== Awards and nominations ==
=== Music awards ===
Year	Organization	Category	Work	Result	Ref.
2020	Hollywood Music in Media Awards	Best Music: Singer-Songwriter	The Unloveable	Nominated	
2023	American Songwriter	American Songwriter Song Contest: Blues	Won't Be Around	Won	
2023	Hollywood Music in Media Awards	Best Music Video (Independent)	Won't Be Around	Nominated	
2023	Hollywood Independent Music Awards	Americana/Roots	Won't Be Around	Nominated	
2023	Josie Music Awards	Album of the Year: Folk/Americana	Ethos: Son of a Sharecropper	Nominated	
2023	Unsigned Only Music Awards	Vocal Performance	Won't Be Around	Won	
2024	International Acoustic Music Awards	Open	Won't Be Around	Runner-up	
2024	Josie Music Awards	Songwriter Achievement	Karma	Nominated	
2025	Blues Blast Music Awards	Historical or Vintage Recording	Chicago Kinfolk: The Juke Joint Blues	Nominated	
2025	Josie Music Awards	Social Impact Video of the Year	All Ways – An Ode To Black Women	Nominated	
2025	Unsigned Only Music Awards	Blues	Won't Be Around	Runner-up	
2025	Unsigned Only Music Awards	Male Vocal	Won't Be Around	Runner-up	
2025	Unsigned Only Music Awards	Music Video	Won't Be Around	Runner-up	

=== Film festival awards ===
Year	Organization	Country	Category	Work	Result	Ref.
2024	Bare Bones International Film Festival	US	Best Music Video USA	Won't Be Around	Won	
2024	Los Angeles Shorts International Film Festival	US	Music Video	Won't Be Around	Official Selection	
2024	Leeds International Film Festival	UK	Music Video	Won't Be Around	Official Selection	
2024	Midwest Film Festival	US	Best Original Music	Won't Be Around	Won	
2024	Moondance International Film Festival	US	Music Video	Won't Be Around	Won	
2024	Prague Independent Film Festival	Czech Republic	Best Music Video	Won't Be Around	Won	
2024	Regina International Film Festival and Awards	Canada	Best Music Video	Won't Be Around	Nominated	
2024	Sidewalk Film Festival	US	Music Video	Wasn't Mine	Official Selection	
2024	Tribeca Film Festival	US	Music Video	Won't Be Around	Official Selection	
2024	Vienna Independent Film Festival	Austria	Best Music Video	Won't Be Around	Won	
2025	Berlin Commercial Festival	Germany	Cultural Impact	All Ways – An Ode To Black Women	Shortlisted	
2025	Berlin Commercial Festival	Germany	Cultural Impact	For You	Official Selection	
2025	Berlin Commercial Festival	Germany	Cultural Impact	Railroad Tracks	Official Selection	
2025	Berlin Commercial Festival	Germany	Craft: Idea	Railroad Tracks	Official Selection	
2025	Berlin Commercial Festival	Germany	Craft: Costume Styling	Railroad Tracks	Official Selection	
2025	Berlin Commercial Festival	Germany	Craft: Use of Sound & Music	For You	Official Selection	
2025	Mill Valley Film Festival	US	Music Video	Won't Be Around	Official Selection	
2025	Moondance International Film Festival	US	Radio Documentary	Chicago Kinfolk: The Juke Joint Blues	Won	
2025	Sarajevo Fashion Film Festival	Bosnia	Best Set Design	Railroad Tracks	Won	
2025	Short Sweet Film Fest	US	Music Video	Won't Be Around	Honorable Mention	
2026	Animaze Montreal International Animation Film Festival	Canada	Animated Music Video	Blur Theory	Official Selection	
2026	Australian Effects & Animation Festival	Australia	Music Video	Mimesis	Silver	
2026	Bengaluru International Short Film Festival	India	Dancing Lens	Body of Glass	Official Selection	
2026	Berlin Commercial Festival	Germany	Craft: AI Generated	Outlaws	Shortlisted	
2026	Berlin Commercial Festival	Germany	Cultural Impact	Outlaws	Shortlisted	
2026	Berlin Commercial Festival	Germany	Cultural Impact	Give Him His Flowers	Shortlisted	
2026	Berlin Commercial Festival	Germany	Craft: VFX/Animation	Mimesis	Shortlisted	
2026	Berlin Commercial Festival	Germany	New Generation Award	Mimesis	Official Selection	
2026	Berlin Commercial Festival	Germany	Craft: Use of Sound & Music	My Gender Is Black (Official Trailer)	Official Selection	
2026	Berlin Commercial Festival	Germany	Craft: Editing	My Gender Is Black (Official Trailer)	Official Selection	
2026	Berlin Commercial Festival	Germany	Spec	Give Him His Flowers	Official Selection	
2026	Berlin Music Video Awards	Germany	Silver Selection	Harlequin	Official Selection	
2026	Bloody Horror International Film Festival	Canada	Best Experimental Music Video	The Residue of Dreams	Won	
2026	Burbank International Film Festival	US	LGBTQ Documentary Short	My Gender Is Black	Nominated	
2026	Chelsea Film Festival	US	Documentary Short	My Gender Is Black	Nominated	
2026	Focus Wales Film Festival	Wales	Music Video	Tell 'Em	Official Selection	
2026	Harvard Divinity School	US	Music Video	Tell 'Em	Official Selection	
2026	London Fashion Film Festival	UK	Best LGBTQ Fashion Film Award	#HIM4FEM	Nominated	
2026	London Fashion Film Festival	UK	Best LGBTQ Talent Award	#HIM4FEM	Nominated	
2026	London Fashion Film Festival	UK	Short	Body of Glass	Official Selection	
2026	Lusca Fantastic Film Festival	US	Music Video	Morphea	Official Selection	
2026	Massimadi: Afro LGBTQ+ Film and Arts Festival	Canada	Experimental Short	My Gender Is Black	Official Selection	
2026	Melbourne WebFest	Australia	Best Trailer	My Gender Is Black (Official Trailer)	Won	
2026	Monster Fest	Australia	Horror Short	The Residue of Dreams	Official Selection	
2026	Odense International Film Festival	Denmark	Music Video	Blur Theory	Official Selection	
2026	Oslo/Fusion International Film Festival	Norway	Short	My Gender Is Black	Nominated	
2026	Reeling: The Chicago LGBTQ+ International Film Festival	US	Short	Masculinities	Official Selection	
2026	Renaissance Film Festival	UK	Best Dance Short	Body of Glass	Won	
2026	Renaissance Film Festival	UK	Music or Dance Short	Shut	Nominated	
2026	Renaissance Film Festival	UK	Music or Dance Short	Whirling Dervish	Nominated	
2026	Renaissance Film Festival	UK	Experimental Short	Parallax	Nominated	
2026	Roxbury International Film Festival	US	Short	Won't Be Around	Official Selection	
2026	San Luis Obispo International Film Festival	US	Music Video	Won't Be Around	Official Selection	
2026	Sidewalk Film Festival	US	Short	Tell 'Em	Official Selection	
2026	UK Film Festival	UK	Music Video	Mimesis	Official Selection	
2026	World Music & Independent Film Festival	US	Best Country Music Video	Won't Be Around	Won	

=== Creative communications, design, and media awards ===
Year	Organization	Category	Work	Result	Ref.
2021	Summit International Awards	Summit Creative Award: Audio	American Descendant of Slavery, the Album	Bronze	
2024	Summit International Awards	Summit Creative Award: Video under $5,000	Won't Be Around	Gold	
2024	Summit International Awards	Summit Creative Award: Direction/Editing	Won't Be Around	Silver	
2025	Anthem Awards	Education, Art & Culture	Chicago Kinfolk: The Juke Joint Blues	Silver	
2025	Cresta International Advertising Awards	Innovative Use of Sound/Audio	Chicago Kinfolk: The Juke Joint Blues	Bronze	
2025	CSS Design Awards	Special Kudos Award	Terry Blade: Heritage in Motion	Won	
2025	CSS Design Awards	UI Design	Terry Blade: Heritage in Motion	Won	
2025	CSS Design Awards	UX Design	Terry Blade: Heritage in Motion	Won	
2025	CSS Design Awards	Innovation	Terry Blade: Heritage in Motion	Won	
2025	CSS Design Awards	Special Kudos Award	Chicago Kinfolk: The Juke Joint Blues	Won	
2025	CSS Design Awards	UX Design	Chicago Kinfolk: The Juke Joint Blues	Won	
2025	Digiday Greater Good Awards	Education	Chicago Kinfolk: The Juke Joint Blues	Shortlisted	
2025	Digiday Greater Good Awards	Racial Equality	Chicago Kinfolk: The Juke Joint Blues	Shortlisted	
2025	Epica Awards	Best Use of Music	Chicago Kinfolk: The Juke Joint Blues	Shortlisted	
2025	Graphis	Graphis Design Award: Music – Print	American Descendant of Slavery, the Album	Silver	
2025	International Design Awards	Multimedia Design	Terry Blade: Portfolio & Cultural Archive	Bronze	
2025	International Design Awards	Website Design	Chicago Kinfolk: The Juke Joint Blues	Honorable Mention	
2025	Shorty Impact Awards	Arts & Culture	Chicago Kinfolk: The Juke Joint Blues	Won	
2025	Shorty Impact Awards	Audio & Music	Chicago Kinfolk: The Juke Joint Blues	Gold	
2025	Summit International Awards	Summit Marketing Effectiveness Award: Social Media Marketing	For You	Platinum	
2025	Summit International Awards	Summit Creative Award: Public Awareness & Advocacy	Chicago Kinfolk: The Juke Joint Blues	Silver	
2025	The One Club Awards Denver	Radio & Audio: Custom Content	Chicago Kinfolk: The Juke Joint Blues	Silver	
2025	The One Club Awards Denver	Radio & Audio: Sound Design	Chicago Kinfolk: The Juke Joint Blues	Silver	
2025	The One Club Awards Denver	Radio & Audio: Use of Music	Chicago Kinfolk: The Juke Joint Blues	Bronze	
2026	Cannes Corporate Media & TV Awards	Trailers and Teasers for Documentaries and Reports	My Gender Is Black	Gold	
2026	Clio Music Awards	Use of Music Craft: Casting/Performance	Chicago Kinfolk: The Juke Joint Blues	Gold	
2026	Clio Music Awards	Use of Music: Use of Music Innovation	Chicago Kinfolk: The Juke Joint Blues	Bronze	
2026	Creative Review Annual Awards	Sound Design & Use of Music	Chicago Kinfolk: The Juke Joint Blues	Shortlisted	
2026	Graphis	Graphis Photography Award: Portraits – Print	Veiled Resonance	Silver	
2026	New York Festivals Radio Awards	Craft: Original Music	Chicago Kinfolk: The Juke Joint Blues	Gold	
2026	Summit International Awards	Digital Media Award: Website – Consumer	Chicago Kinfolk: The Juke Joint Blues	Visionary	
2026	The One Show Awards	Craft: Sound Design & Music	Chicago Kinfolk: The Juke Joint Blues	Merit	

=== Literary awards ===
Year	Organization	Category	Work	Result	Ref.
2026	Next Generation Indie Book Awards	Non-Fiction (Grand Prize)	Of Bloodlines and Blue Notes: Lyrics, Album Notes and Critical Essays	Won	
2026	Next Generation Indie Book Awards	E-Book (Non-Fiction)	Of Bloodlines and Blue Notes: Lyrics, Album Notes and Critical Essays	Won	
2026	Next Generation Indie Book Awards	Social Justice	Of Bloodlines and Blue Notes: Lyrics, Album Notes and Critical Essays	Won	
