= Terry Blade =

American multidisciplinary artist and musician.

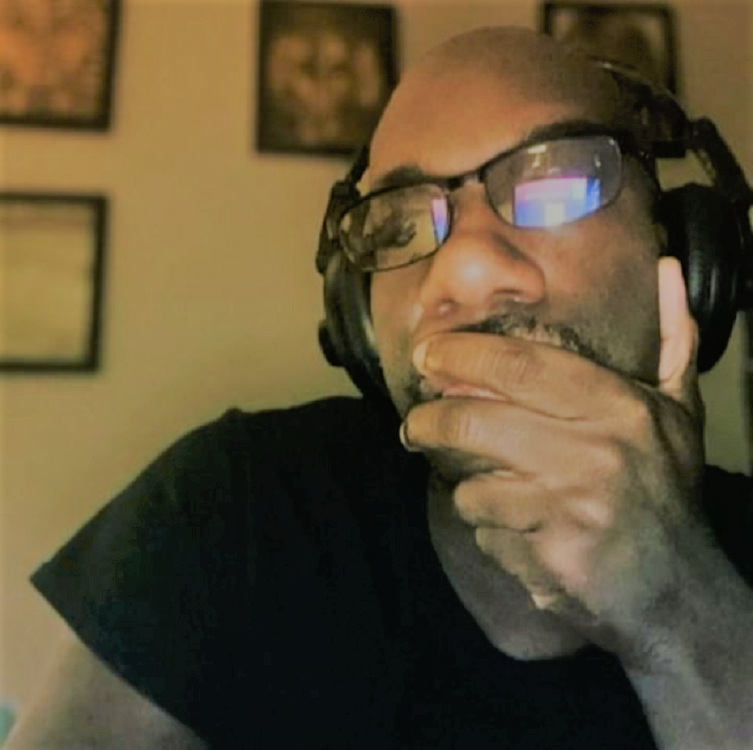
- Blade at a studio session in 2022
- Born: 1986 (age 39–40); Washington, D.C.
- Occupations: multidisciplinary artist; singer-songwriter
- Years active: 2020-present
- Known for: Won't Be Around; Chicago Kinfolk: The Juke Joint Blues; My Gender Is Black; Of Bloodlines and Blue Notes
- Style: archival radio documentary
- Movement: video art; blues revival
- Awards: Clio Music Awards; The One Show; Shorty Impact Awards; New York Festival Radio Awards; Next Generation Indie Book Awards; Australian Effects & Animation Festival; Full list
- Website: terryblademusic.com

Terry Blade (born 1986) is an American multidisciplinary artist and singer-songwriter based in the Chicago metropolitan area. His work spans music, experimental film, multimedia design, nonfiction, and public interest media. His projects explore African-American history, queer identity, and the use of sound and image as historical records.

Blade directed the music video Won't Be Around, which premiered at the 2024 Tribeca Festival. He also directed the animated experimental video Mimesis, which won Silver at the 2026 Australian Effects & Animation Festival. His 2025 album and ethnographic audio project Chicago Kinfolk: The Juke Joint Blues won honors at the Clio Music Awards, Shorty Impact Awards, The One Show, and New York Festivals Radio Awards.

Blade's 2026 book Of Bloodlines and Blue Notes won the grand prize for nonfiction at the Next Generation Indie Book Awards. The same year, his documentary My Gender Is Black opened the 18th edition of the Massimadi: Afro LGBTQ+ Film and Arts Festival in Montreal, and its teaser-trailer won Gold at the Cannes Corporate Media & TV Awards.

== Early life ==
Blade was born and raised in Washington, DC. His family heritage is rooted in the American South; his grandparents were from the region, and his grandfather specifically hailed from Colerain, North Carolina. He has stated that his great-grandfather was a sharecropper, and his grandfather was taken out of school at a young age to work.

Blade has discussed regularly experiencing homophobia by the age of 12. He has stated that growing up Black, gay, and gender non-conforming was "rough" and "one of the most painful experiences" he "didn't think [he] would survive".

Blade relocated to Chicago, Illinois.

== Career ==
=== Music ===
Blade debuted his acoustic demo "The Unloveable" on April 3, 2020; the track received a nomination at the 11th Hollywood Music in Media Awards and later appeared as the opening song on his EP Misery, released on May 8, 2020. That same year, he released the a cappella single "The 'Karen' Blues", which was described by musician Adeem the Artist as "witty and biting".

==== American Descendant of Slavery, the Album (2021) and Neo Queer (2022) ====
Blade released his debut studio album, American Descendant of Slavery, the Album, on February 5, 2021. Reviews noted that the release combined folk, rock, and soul elements with spoken word excerpts from the 1940s of formerly enslaved African Americans. Adeem the Artist highlighted the album's track "MTF" for drawing parallels to real-world cases involving violence against black transgender women. The Archives of African American Music and Culture included the album among its "February 2021 Black Music Releases of Note". The album later won a Summit Creative Award for Audio.

Blade released his second studio album, Neo Queer, on January 14, 2022. The album used Neo soul and R&B to explore what he described as "love of self, love of others, and love unrequited" derived from a black queer experience. Days later, Blade was featured on Frankie Francis's Amazing Afternoons broadcast on Amazing Radio.

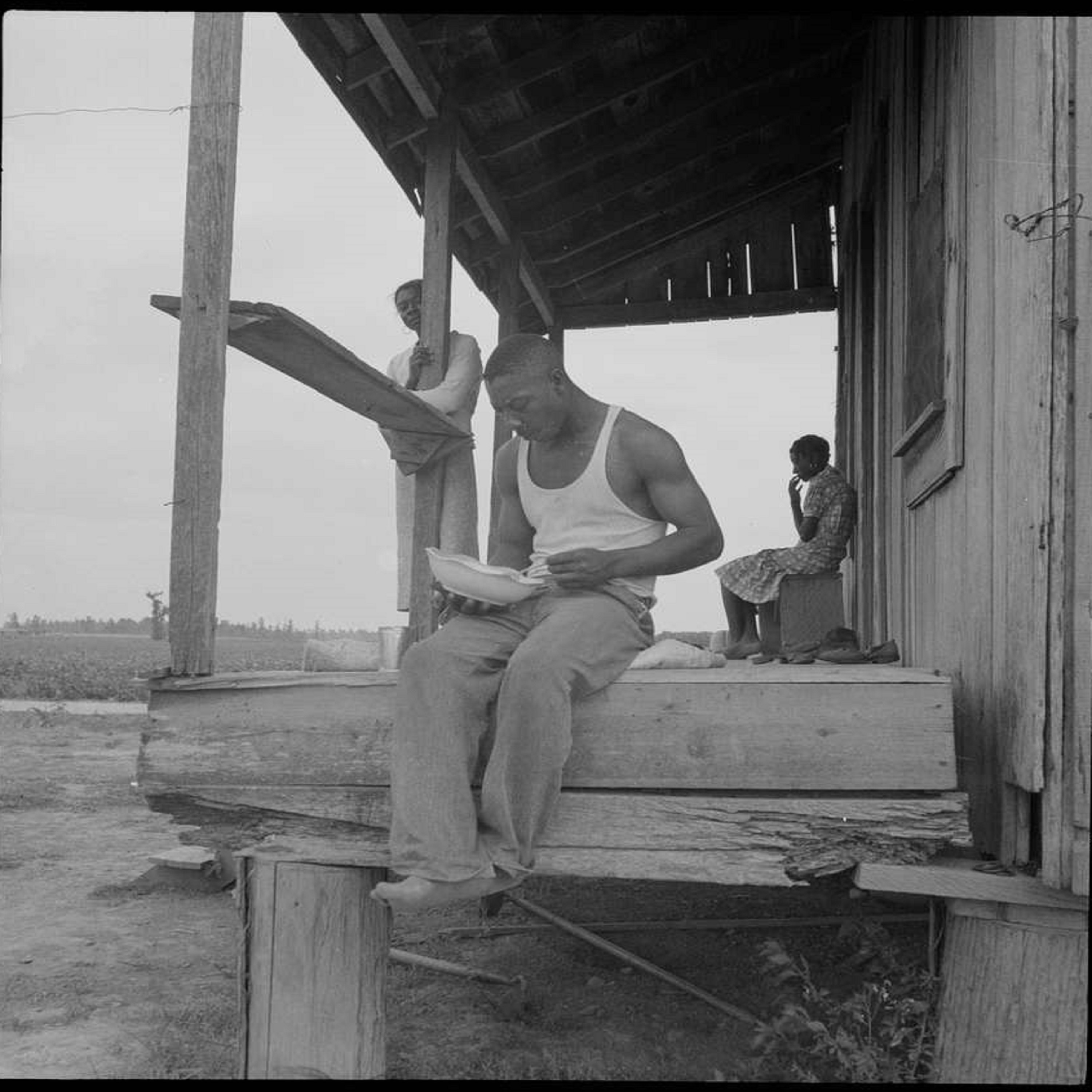
Photograph used as album cover for Ethos: Son of a Sharecropper

==== Won't Be Around (2023) and Ethos: Son of a Sharecropper (2023) ====
Blade released the blues single "Won’t Be Around" on January 6, 2023. The song received a Hollywood Independent Music Award nomination and entered the New Music Weekly Country Up & Coming chart following national radio airplay. The song "Won't Be Around" won first place in the Blues category of the 2023 American Songwriter Song Contest.

He released his third studio album, Ethos: Son of a Sharecropper, on February 3, 2023. The album used blues, folk, gospel and country music to explore his North Carolina ancestry and the legacy of African-American sharecropper labor. Blade used a 1937 photograph taken by Dorothea Lange of an African-American sharecropper near Clarksdale, Mississippi.

Reviews noted the album for blending blues, gospel, and country to explore themes of family history and Southern African-American identity. One review noted the album for its voice-led arrangements and use of first-person accounts. The album was included on The Boot's list of "Most Wanted Music: 2023’s Country, Americana, Bluegrass and Folk Album Releases".

==== Tell 'Em (2025) and Chicago Kinfolk: The Juke Joint Blues (2025) ====
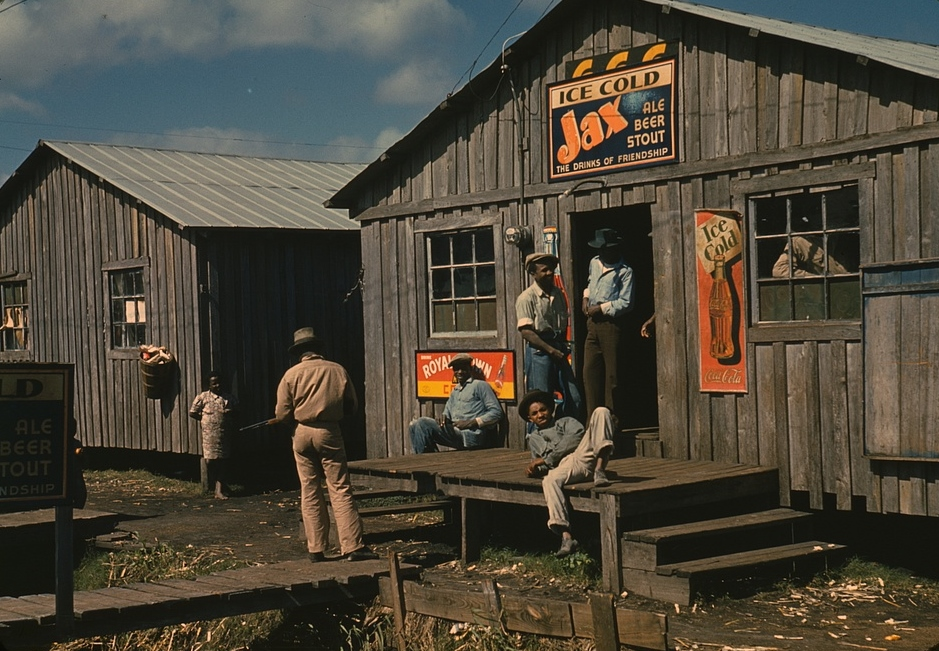
Photograph used as album cover for Chicago Kinfolk: The Juke Joint Blues

Blade released the blues single "Tell 'Em" on January 3, 2025. The song was distributed by Paris-based record label Groover and music distributor IDOL. Reviews described "Tell 'Em" as Blade's "folk-blues approach to protest music", and noted that the song's themes of oppression and racial injustice drew inspiration from "real-life cases like Cyntoia Brown and Isaiah Brown".

He released his ethnographic audio project and fourth studio album Chicago Kinfolk: The Juke Joint Blues, on February 28, 2025. The project's cover is a 1941 photograph taken by Marion Post Wolcott of a juke joint in Belle Glade, Florida. The project was also distributed by Groover and IDOL.

Musician Ryan Cassata described Chicago Kinfolk: The Juke Joint Blues as "a historical preservation effort". Reviews noted the release for its focus on Chicago blues history, with some highlighting Blade's cover performance of "That's All Right" by Arthur Crudup, which was originally recorded in Chicago in 1946. Reviews also noted the release for incorporating archival interviews of Chicago blues figures such as Theresa Needham and Lefty Dizz, which were conducted in 1977 as part of the Chicago Ethnic Arts Project for the American Folklife Center.

Some reviews of Chicago Kinfolk: The Juke Joint Blues likened Blade to English folklorist Cecil Sharp, noting that the project "is difficult to call a music album in the usual sense", and is "more of an ethnographic record, a historical archive of early blues than just another album". Mystic Sons rated the album a 7 out of 10, noting that the project "captur[es] the same simple, almost live, performances that the genre is most known for". Country Universe rated the album a 4.5 out of 5, noting that the project "works as brilliantly as a concept album about historical precedent as it does as an example of the vitality of the form itself".

On May 21, 2025, Blade's cover performance of "That's All Right" was featured on the Amazing Radio Festival Pass broadcast of the Download Festival. Two months later, Chicago Kinfolk: The Juke Joint Blues received a nomination for Historical or Vintage Recording at the Blues Blast Music Awards, and was later shortlisted for Best Use of Music at the Epica Awards and Creative Review Annual Awards. The project won two Clio Music Awards for Use of Music Craft and Use of Music Innovation, a One Show Award for Sound Design & Music, a New York Festivals Radio Award for Original Music, and a Cresta Award for Innovative Use of Sound/Audio. The project also received recognition for its social impact, winning two Shorty Impact Awards for Arts & Culture and Audio & Music, and an Anthem Award for Education, Art & Culture.

On November 21, 2025, Blade was included in Music Connection's "Top 25 New Music Critiques of 2025". Two months later, Chicago Kinfolk: The Juke Joint Blues was included as an honorable mention in Country Universe's "The Forty Best Country Albums of 2025". The project's companion website also won a Summit Digital Media Award for Website - Consumer.

=== Film and video ===
==== Won't Be Around (2024), All Ways (2025), and Railroad Tracks (2025) ====
Blade directed and produced the music video for "Won't Be Around", which premiered at the Tribeca Film Festival. It went on to screen as official selections of the Mill Valley Film Festival, Roxbury International Film Festival, and the San Luis Obispo International Film Festival. On August 26, 2024, the Midwest Film Festival held a public screening of "Won't Be Around" at the School of the Art Institute of Chicago. The video won the festival's Best of the Midwest Award for Best Original Music.

The video received a nomination at the 14th Hollywood Music in Media Awards. A month later, it won a Summit Creative Award for Direction/Editing and for Video under $5,000. The video also won Best Music Video awards at the Bare Bones International Film Festival, Moondance International Film Festival, Prague Independent Film Festival, the Vienna Independent Film Festival, and the World Music & Independent Film Festival.

Blade directed and produced the music video for "All Ways", which premiered at the Cyprus International Film Festival and was shortlisted for a Berlin Commercial Award in the Cultural Impact category at the Berlin Commercial Festival. He also directed and produced a music video for "Railroad Tracks", which later premiered at the Berlin Commercial Festival, and won the award for Best Set Design at the Sarajevo Fashion Film Festival. In 2026, the Berlin Music Video Awards included another Blade short, Harlequin, in its separate Silver Screenings presentation.

==== My Gender Is Black (2026) ====
Blade directed and wrote My Gender Is Black, an experimental documentary that addresses masculinity, sexuality and racial expectations of the body. The film combines interviews with portraits, archival imagery, sound and dance sequences. It also tackles themes of stigma, femininity, masculinity and self-definition among Black queer men.

Some reviews noted the film for its distinct voices and challenge to restrictive definitions of Black masculinity. Other reviews questioned whether the film's stylistic changes and limited context diminished its coherence. Another review noted the film for its cinematography and music, and commented that Blade's "images and music intensify the conversation rather than compete with it."

On August 5, 2026, My Gender Is Black was featured as an LGBTQ and Documentary Short at the Burbank International Film Festival. The Oslo/Fusion International Film Festival included the film in its September 2026 program. The Chelsea Film Festival selected the documentary for its October 2026 program in New York. An excerpt of the film opened the 18th edition of the Massimadi Festival in Montreal for its Canadian premiere.

Blade also directed and edited the documentary's teaser-trailer. The trailer received Gold in the category for documentary trailers and teasers at the 2026 Cannes Corporate Media & TV Awards. It reached finalist status for Best Sync in a Film, Series or Programme Trailer at the 2026 Music+Sound Awards.

==== Other audiovisual projects ====
Blade directed the experimental animated music videos Blur Theory and Mimesis. Blur Theory was featured at the 2026 editions of Animaze Montreal International Animation Festival, Odense International Film Festival, and International Film Festival of Wales. Mimesis won Silver in the music video category at the 2026 Australian Effects & Animation Festival, and was shortlisted in the VFX/Animation category at 2026 Berlin Commercial Festival.

Blade also developed short experimental works such as Shut, Parallax, Whirling Dervish and Body of Glass. The 2026 New Renaissance Film Festival in London featured Shut, Parallax and Whirling Dervish alongside Body of Glass, which won Best Dance Short. The 2026 London Fashion Film Festival placed Body of Glass on its program alongside Blade's #HIM4FEM.

Blade's narrative short Tell 'Em screened at the 2026 Sidewalk Film Festival. His experimental horror short The Residue of Dreams was included in the 2026 Trasharama program of Monster Fest in Melbourne.

=== Writing ===
Blade published Of Bloodlines and Blue Notes: Lyrics, Album Notes and Critical Essays, through Blade Arthouse Media in January 2026. The book combined essays, lyrics, album notes and reflections on the histories and musical forms behind American Descendant of Slavery, Ethos: Son of a Sharecropper and Chicago Kinfolk: The Juke Joint Blues.

Publishers Weekly described the book as a "direct and unflinching work of reckoning, both personal and societal", and designated it as an Editor's Pick. Kirkus Reviews described the book as a "serious and important book about music, lineage, and the moral weight of paying attention", but noted that Blade's commentary can at times, "stand in front of the work rather than beside it".

The book won the grand prize for nonfiction at the 2026 Next Generation Indie Book Awards.

== Personal life ==
Blade resides in the Chicago metropolitan area. He is queer.

== Filmography ==
Year	Title	Format	Blade's credited role(s)	Source
2023	Won't Be Around	Music video	Director; producer	
2023	Wasn't Mine	Music video	Director	
2024	All Ways - An Ode to Black Women	Music video	Director; producer	
2025	Railroad Tracks	Music video	Director; producer	
2026	Blur Theory	Animated music video	Director	
2026	Mimesis	Animated music video	Director	
2026	The Residue of Dreams	Experimental horror short	Director	
2026	Morphea	Experimental horror short	Director	
2026	Harlequin	Music video	Director	
2026	Shut	Experimental short	Director	
2026	Parallax	Experimental short	Director	
2026	Whirling Dervish	Experimental short	Director	
2026	Body of Glass	Experimental dance short	Director	
2026	#HIM4FEM	Fashion short	Director	
2026	The 5 Temperaments	Experimental dance short	Director	
2026	My Gender Is Black	Experimental documentary short	Director; writer	
2026	My Gender Is Black (trailer)	Documentary trailer	Director; music supervisor	

== Discography ==
=== Studio albums ===
Year	Title	Label	Source
2021	American Descendant of Slavery, the Album	Starburst Records	
2022	Neo Queer	Blade Modus Records	
2023	Ethos: Son of a Sharecropper	Blade Modus Records	
2025	Chicago Kinfolk: The Juke Joint Blues	Groover Spark	

=== Extended plays ===
Year	Title	Source
2020	Misery	
2021	The 4 Miseries	
2021	Unmastered: The Demo Sessions	

=== Selected singles ===
Year	Title	Source
2020	"The Unloveable"	
2020	"The Karen Blues"	
2021	"Black Hurts"	
2022	"For You"	
2023	"Won't Be Around"	
2025	"Tell 'Em"	

== Other works ==
Year	Title	Medium or type	Source
2026	Of Bloodlines and Blue Notes: Lyrics, Album Notes and Critical Essays	Nonfiction book	
2026	Veiled Resonance	Portrait photography	
2026	American Franchise	Public interest audiovisual campaign	
2026	Check On Him	Public interest audiovisual campaign	
2026	The 5 Temperaments (trailer)	Film trailer	
