= Nico Beyer =

German film director and producer (born 1964)

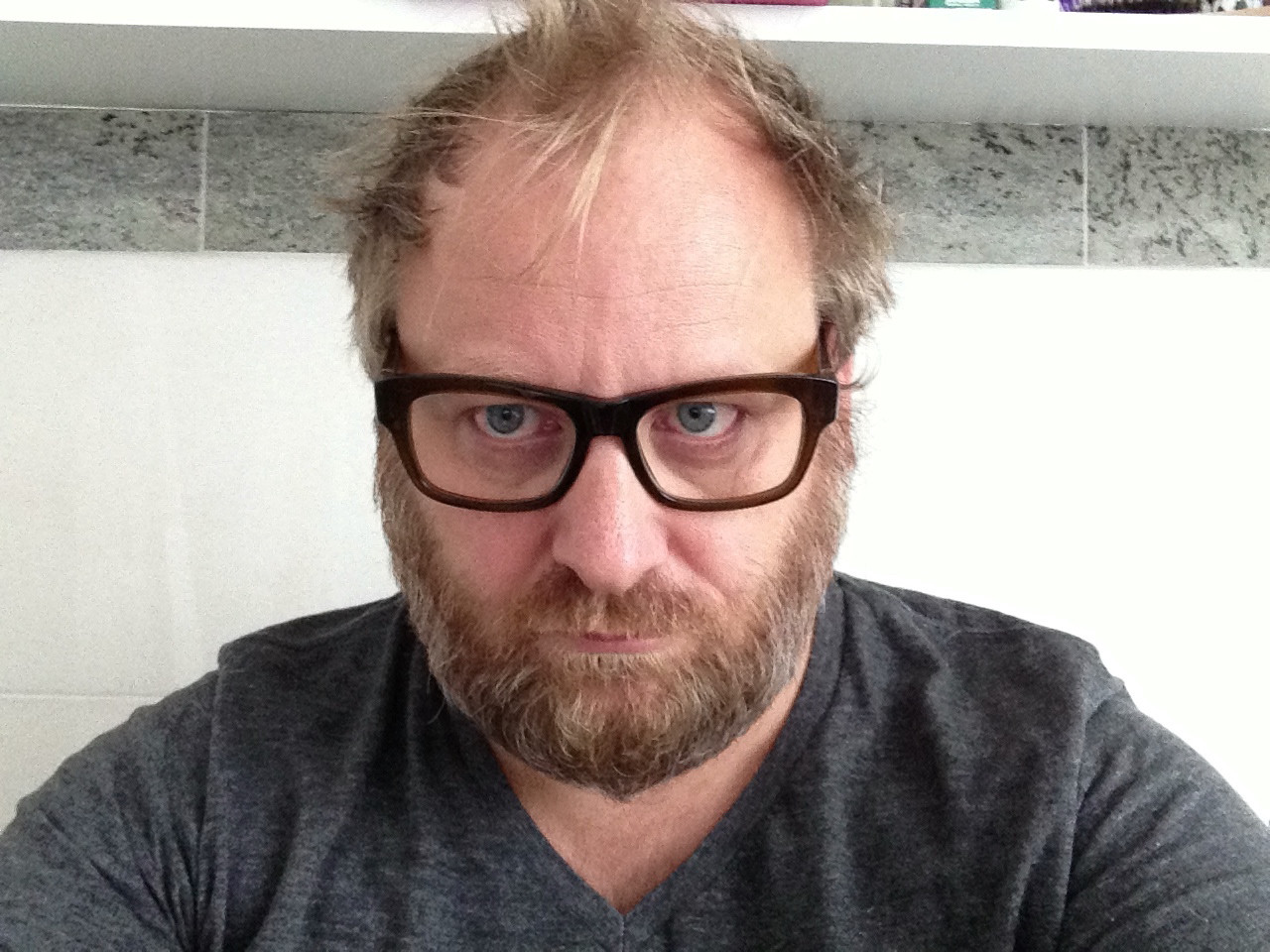
- Beyer in Berlin, Germany, 2013
- Born: June 15, 1964 (age 62); Wilhelmshaven, West Germany
- Occupations: Film director; producer
- Awards: Awards list
- Website: nicobeyer.com

Nico Beyer (born 15 June 1964) is a German film director and producer. He is noted for his unique visual style and wide array of different techniques and formats.

His commercial work has won him numerous, international awards, such as gold and silver Lions in Cannes, Clio Awards, Cresta International Advertising Awards, ADC, LIA, CICLOPE, D&AD, New York Festivals, Eurobest, Red Dot Awards, among many others.

Beyer is well known for his video collaborations with the Pet Shop Boys, The Verve, They Might Be Giants and Suzanne Vega, as well as for his award-winning advertising campaigns.

== Early life ==
Beyer was born in Wilhelmshaven, Germany. He is the son of artist Ulli Beyer and the grandson of writer Anja Lundholm. After graduating from the Kunstakademie Düsseldorf, Beyer worked with renown video artist Nam June Paik and Horst H. Baumann, documenting their work on video.

== Career ==
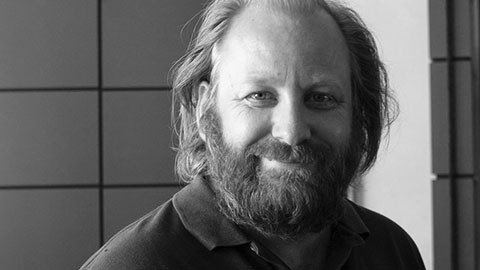
Nico Beyer in Berlin in 2010

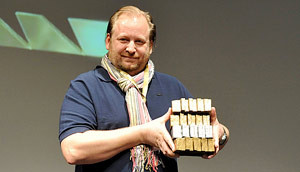
Nico Beyer in Hamburg (Germany), at the German Awards in 2011. Nico won 4 awards ( 2 x gold, 1 x silver and 1 x bronze ) for Hornbach "Hymne Des Machens".

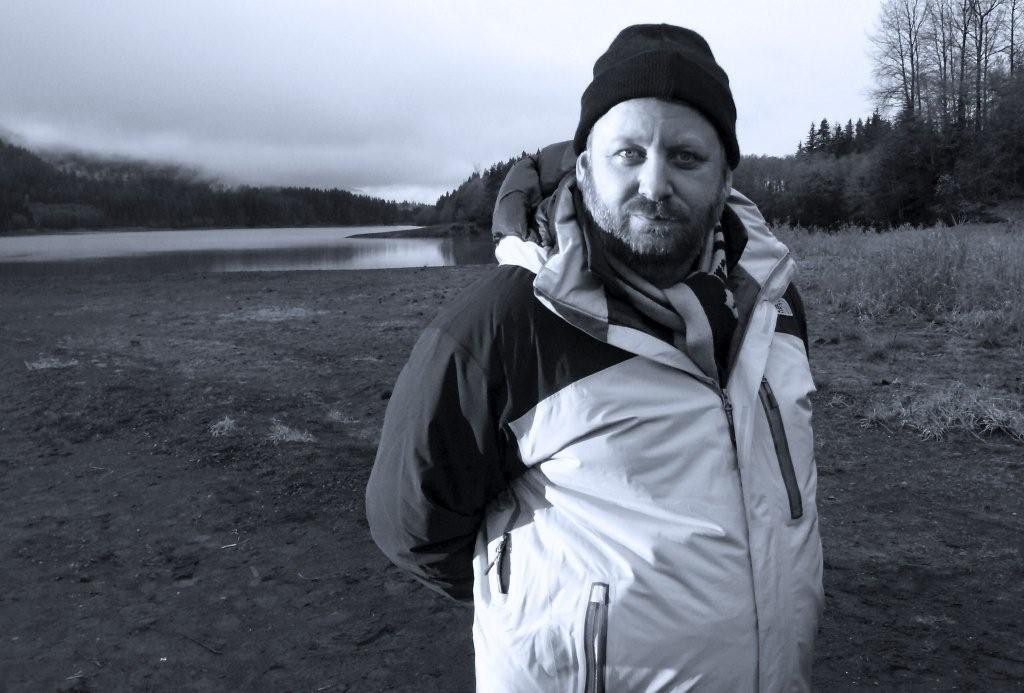
Nico Beyer in Seattle in 2012 on the production of CHEVROLET Chevy Runs Deep campaign

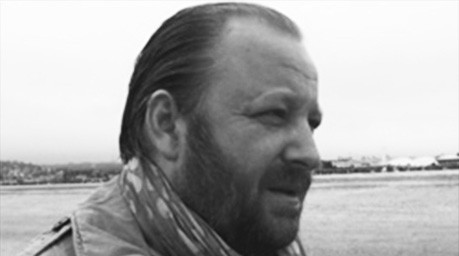
Nico Beyer in Paris in 2016

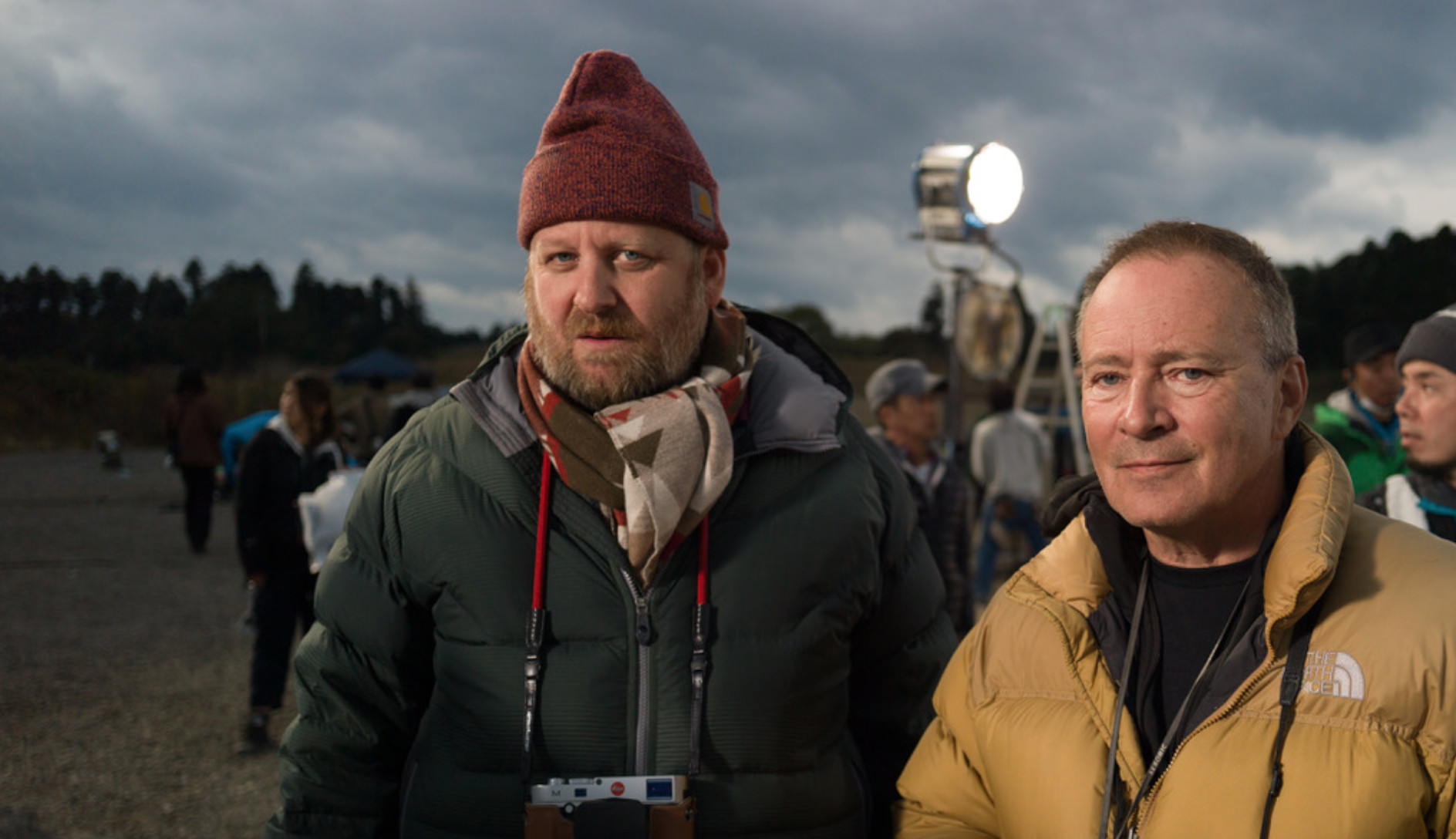
Nico Beyer and Serge Roman on the shoot of Asahi Superdry in Tokyo in 2016

Beyers career as a filmmaker began with creating idents for MTV Europe, which gained him international recognition. In 1991 he then moved from Düsseldorf to Paris, where he signed with international production company Partizan. His videos and first TV spots for fashion designer Thierry Mugler, Diesel, Der Spiegel, Jason Donovan, Forbes magazine ignited his international advertising career. Beyer signed with Propaganda Films in Hollywood (1993) and later Passport Films and then Compass Films and directed campaigns, such as Mercedes-Benz, Panasonic, Swatch (featuring Nina Hagen) etc... He moved from Paris to New York City. Beyer also continued his music video work and directed videos for The Shamen, U96, Swing Out Sister, Suzanne Vega, Tony! Toni! Toné!, Erasure, Cocteau Twins, Galliano and They Might Be Giants.

In 1996, Beyer moved from New York City to Berlin. He opened his own production company Mann Im Mond.

So far, Beyer was experimenting with digital post-production. His unique style was best featured in Shots magazine.

From now on, Beyer focused on pure photography, story telling and cinematic images.

As a result, Beyer shot his first short film Phantom(1998), which premiered at the Berlinale (Berlin Film Festival).

Beyer now used advertising to tell stories and to work with actors, which was most visible in his music videos for Deine Lakaien and Eartling.

He directed TV spots for Frankfurter Allgemeine Zeitung, SWR, Audi, Renault and Coca-Cola, which won him silver and gold Lions at the renown Cannes Lions Festival, as well as Gold at the New York Film Festival, Gold at the Art Directors Club of New York.

Beyer moved back to Paris (1999), where he continued his work with his new production company Chased by Cowboys and his new business partner Edward Grann. Beyer's visual style enabled him to enter into car advertising. His campaign for Infinity (2001) and collaboration with advertising agency Chiat Day, started his career in American advertising.

He joined Chased by Cowboys in Venice, California, owned by Exec. Producer Linda Ross and directed renown campaigns, such as Mercedes's launch of the E Class and the epic Super Bowl spot for the new Ford F 150 truck (2004). Beyer further directed TV spots for Lexus, Canon, Nike, BMW, Cadillac and Land Rover.

Many awards followed: Gold at the Cannes Lions Festival, Gold at the Clio Awards etc...

Beyer also started a career in Japan. His campaign for Nissan Stagea and collaboration with advertising agency Hakohodu was extremely successful.

Beyer shared his time between Paris and Los Angeles (2003 - 2008). Directing and producing for his own company Chased by Cowboys.

In 2004, Beyer directed his first TV show Gottschalk America featuring celebrity host Thomas Gottschalk. In the same year, Beyer collaborated with Michael Moore on his campaign against former US president George W. Bush. Beyer directed a spot, which shows George W. Bush as the great dictator, recreating the famous dance with the globe of Charlie Chaplin masterpiece The Great Dictator. The spot won Gold at the non-profit AD Spot Festival.

In addition, he directs TC commercials and music videos. Beyer is represented by Armoury and Element E in the European market. His recent campaigns include projects for brands like Hornbach, Audi, Lexus, Jeep, Mercedes, Sky, Smart, Axe, O2 (Telefónica) and Adidas. Between 2022 and 2024, he also directed spots for McDonald's, Qatar Airways, Star Alliance, M, AMG, and Land Rover.

Currently Beyer is focused on a 90-minute documentary feature titled Never grow up, which explores the Mod scene and its evolution over time. In 2010 he published the book Dreiknopf & Dosenbier that covers the Mod scene in Germany.

His works has earned him numerous international awards, including Lions in Cannes, Clio Awards, Cresta International Advertising Awards, ADC, LIA, Eurobest, Spotlight, Klappe, Red Dot Design Award, Stevie Award and more. Particularly for his campaigns for Hornbach and a commercial for Caritas.

== Filmography ==
=== Short films ===
- Phantom (1998)
- 99 (2000)

=== Documentaries ===
- Düsseldorf (1991)

=== Web films ===
- Die MTV - OMA (2001)
- Die Klitschkos (2011)
- Kaufhaus Des Irrsinns (2012)
- Harald & Franz (2014)
- Bosch (2015)

=== Music videos ===
- "Dame" - Emile Wandelmer (1990)
- "Candy Oh" - Bond (1992)
- "Où trouver les violins" - Art Mengo (1992)
- "Baby Blues" - Eddy Mitchell (1992)
- "Cocaine" - Soul Patrol (1992)
- "Notgonnachange" - Swing Out Sister (1992)
- "Comin' On Strong" - The Shamen (1993)
- "Blood Makes Noise" - Suzanne Vega (1993)
- "99.9 Fahrenheit" - Suzanne Vega (1993)
- "Nowhere" - Therapy? (1994)
- "Run to the Sun" - Erasure (1994)
- "Snail Shell" - They Might Be Giants (1994)
- "Destination Eschaton" - The Shamen (1995)
- "This Is Music" - The Verve (1995)
- "Leavin'" - Tony Toni Tone (1995)
- "Evangeline" - The Cocteau Twins (1995)
- "Love Religion" - U96 (1995)
- "Chain Reaction" - "Hurricane N°1" (1995)
- "Fire" - Die Krupps (1996)
- "Ease Your Mind" - Galliano (1996)
- "Mind Machine" - Deine Lakaien (1996)
- "Away" - Deine Lakaien (1997)
- "Echo On My Mind" - Earthling (1997)
- "Fly away" - "Aaron Flower" (1997)
- "Cry, Crazy, Crazy" - Düsenjäger (1998)
- "Flamboyant" - Pet Shop Boys (2004)
- "36 Grad" - Zweiraumwohnung (2011)
- "Out the Blue" - Sub Focus ft Alice Gold
- "One Final Song" - The Buggs (2023)
- "Wasted" - The Molotovs (2024)

=== Advertisements ===
- DIESEL - Motor Gang
- FORBES MAGAZINE - Party
- GAPSTAR - Cadillac
- VITOS - Le Pull
- ALPIA - Schokoladenmeister - Campaign of 12 films
- FISKARS - Scissor
- CLORETTES - Gum
- DER SPIEGEL - the wall
- KARLSBERG PILSENER - the messenger
- RADIO NRJ - party
- PANASONIC - Videorecorder des Jahres
- TUI - Tochter
- APOLLINARIS - Campaign of 4 films
- FREUNDIN - Campaign of 4 Films
- JUNGHANS - Airport
- MERCEDES - Colours
- MERCEDES - Kilometer
- OTTO VERSAND - Red Dress
- SCHIESSER - Rowing
- SPARKASSE - Girl
- SWATCH - Campaign of 10 films
- SWISS AIR - Business Class
- COLGATE - Bathroom
- FROSTA - Campaign of 3 films
- HOLLYWOOD CHEWING GUM - Campaign of 3 films
- NECTA - Pineapple
- NTV - Fernsehen macht dumm - Campaign of 4 films
- BUNTE - Claudia Schiffer
- LANGNESE - Blizz
- AUDI - the Trip
- RENAULT - Megane
- FRANKFURTER ALLGEMEINE ZEITUNG - Dahinter steckt immer ein kluger Kopf - Campaign of 3 films
- DEUTSCHE TELEKOM - Skype
- L OREAL - Expedition
- NIKE - Michael Stich
- SWR - Violence
- SWR - Class Room
- SWR - Father & Son
- COCA COLA - Armpits
- INFINITY - Campaign of 8 films
- NIKE - Young heroes
- K-SWISS - The Vibe
- LEXUS - Ralley
- MAZDA - Zoom Zoom - Campaign of 10 films
- MERCEDES - Production Line
- GERMAN RED CROSS - Coins
- LUCKY STRIKE - Coin
- FISHERMANS FRIEND - Trip
- NISSAN - Stagea - Campaign of 7 films
- CADILLAC - Sprinkler
- CANNON - Printer - Campaign of 3 films
- GM - Winter Drive
- GMC - Truck of the year - Campaign of 3 films
- THRIFTY - the works - Campaign of 2 films
- DEUTSCHE POST - The Breaks
- ONE - Engine
- ASAHI - Rush
- BMW - Digits
- FORD - F 150 - Campaign of 7 films
- DEUTSCHE BANK - Shopping
- BP - Journey
- SUZUKI - Campaign of 5 films
- Hyundai - Excellence
- SIEMENS - Black & White
- BUICK - Campaign of 3 films
- CHEVROLET - record player
- PENZOIL - dragster
- QUAKER STATE - Race
- AUTOTRADER - the mix
- BMW - X5 - Campaign of 4 films
- LAND ROVER - New Land
- SNICKERS - The Giant
- H&M - Berlin
- MASERATI - Grand Tourismo
- POKERSTARS - Boris Becker
- PUMA - sleep
- VOLKSWAGEN - Scirocco
- SONY - Lola
- HORNBACH - Hymne
- MERCEDES - Tinker
- Chevrolet - Chevy runs deep - Campaign of 4 films
- JEEP - New York
- McFIT - die Klitschkos
- ADIDAS - Bayern
- NATO - Campaign of 3 films
- DEUTSCHE TELEKOM - Football
- MEDIA MARKT - Kaufhaus des Irrsinns
- RED BULL - X Fighters
- SKY - Karl Lagerfeld - Campaign of 3 films
- CARITAS - Fliegen
- CARITAS - Progress
- CARITAS - Neighbours
- BUNDESLIGA - racism
- NIKON - London 2012 ( Olympic Games )
- OSRAM / SYLVANIA - Campaign of 3 films
- QBE - rocket
- SMART - Beep Beep
- SPARKASSE - Mütter
- POSTBANK - Pigs
- SKY - Champions League
- TOYOTA - Vellfire
- TOYOTA - Prius
- ADIDAS - Alaba
- ASAHI - Super Dry
- AUSTRIAN AIRLINES - Campaign of 3 films
- McDONALD'S - Easy Morning
- AXE - Mature
- WÜRTH - Market
- O2 - Campaign of 8 films
- MCDONALD'S - 60 Years
- RWE - Germany
- SCHWEIZ TOURISMUS - 150 Years
- SKODA - Line up
- WEB.DE - E Mail
- AMG - One man - one engine
- BOSCH - the plug
- JÄGERMEISTER - Campaign of 3 films
- MERCEDES BENZ - C Class - Campaign of 3 films
- AUDI - Q
- BMW GROUP - The next 100 years
- GOODYEAR - Juventus Turin
- ADIDAS - Bayern München
- HORNBACH- Heldenkranz
- RENAULT - Megane II
- MIGROS BANK - Slow motion
- SUZUKI - Ignis

=== Television ===
- RTL RAGAZZI (1993)
- GOTTSCHALK AMERICA, 10 Episodes (2003 / 2004)
- SALUT HELMUT, pilot (2007)

== Awards ==
- 2024 : GERMAN STEVIE AWARDS. Gold, Kommunikations- oder PR Kampagne/ PR-Programm des Jahres-Umwelt"
- 2024 : GERMAN STEVIE AWARDS. Gold, Projekt des Jahres im Bereich Natur & biologische Vielfalt"
- 2017 : Art Directors Club. Bronze for film "Heldenkranz" (category: TV)
- 2017 : CICLOPE FESTIVAL. Winner for film "Heldenkranz" (category: Writing)
- 2017 : ANNUAL MULTI MEDIA AWARDS. Gold for film "Heldenkranz" (category: TV / Film)
- 2017 : SPOTLIGHT AWARD. Silver for film "Heldenkranz" (category: Digital Campaign)
- 2017 : DIE KLAPPE. Bronze for film "Heldenkranz" (category: TV)
- 2017 : AME Awards. Gold for film "Heldenkranz" (category: media film)
- 2017 : AME Awards. Silver for film "Heldenkranz" (category: social media)
- 2017 : Eurobest European Advertising Festival. Finalist for film "Heldenkranz" (category: Integrated)
- 2017 : Jahrbuch der Werbung. Bronze for film "Heldenkranz" (category: Integrated)
- 2016 : London International Awards. Bronze for film "Heldenkranz" (category: Verbal Identity)
- 2015 : Red Dot. Winner for film "I'm loving’ it 2.0" (category: Sound Design)
- 2015 : Art Directors Club. Finalist for film "I'm loving’ it 2.0" (category: Music / Sound)
- 2015 : London International Awards. Bronze for film "I'm loving’ it 2.0" (category: Sound)
- 2015 : GERMAN ADVERTISING FESTIVAL. Winner for film "Global Neighbors" (category: Art Direction)
- 2015 : Cresta International Advertising Awards. Winner for film "Progress" (category: Craft : Special Effects)
- 2014 : CICLOPE FESTIVAL CICLOPE FESTIVAL. Gold for film "Global Neighbors" (category: Production Design)
- 2014 : Clio Awards. Finalist for film "Global Neighbours" (category: TV / Cinema)
- 2014 : Canadian Conference of the Arts. Gold for film "Easy Morning" (category: TV)
- 2013 : MOBIUS AWARD CALIFORNIA. Winner for film "easy morning" (category: TV)
- 2012 : Art Directors Club. Finalist for film "Kaufhaus des Irrsinns" (category: TV / Cinema)
- 2012 : AME Awards. Finalist for film "never give up" (category: Film Direction)
- 2012 : Cannes Lions International Festival of Creativity. Finalist for film "Progress" (category: Cinematography)
- 2012 : Cannes Lions International Festival of Creativity. Finalist for film "Progress" (category: Sound Design)
- 2012 : New York Festivals. Finalist for film "never give up" (category: on line Films)
- 2012 : Communicator Awards. Gold Award of Excellence for film "Avoid Crash" (category: TV)
- 2012 : Communicator Awards. Silver for film "Safety Hazards" (category: TV / Cinema)
- 2012 : Communicator Awards. Silver for film "Safety Proofing" (category: TV / Cinema)
- 2012 : Communicator Awards. Silver for film "Dashboard Lights" (category: TV / Cinema)
- 2012 : TELLY AWARDS. Silver for film "Safety Hazards" (category: Automotive)
- 2012 : TELLY AWARDS. Silver for film "Safety Proofing" (category: Automotive)
- 2012 : TELLY AWARDS. Bronze for film "Dashboard Lights" (category: Automotive)
- 2012 : TELLY AWARDS. Bronze for film "Avoid Crash" (category: Automotive)
- 2012 : Red Dot. Grand Prix for film "Progress" (category: TV / Cinema)
- 2011 : Art Directors Club. Bronze for film "never give up" (category: Internet Films)
- 2011 : Art Directors Club. Finalist for film "never give up" (category: Casting)
- 2011 : DIE KLAPPE. Bronze for film "never give up" (category: online Film)
- 2010 : Art Directors Club. Silver for film "Hymne" (category: TV / Cinema )
- 2010 : Art Directors Club. Silver for film "Hymne" (category: Craft / Director)
- 2010 : London International Awards. Silver for film "Hymne" (category: Direction)
- 2010 : London International Awards. Silver for film "Hymne" (category: Cinematography)
- 2010 : SPOTLIGHT AWARD SPOTLIGHT AWARD. Gold for film "Hymne" (category: TV / Cinema)
- 2010 : DIE KLAPPE. Gold for film "Hymne" (category: Best Direction)
- 2010 : DIE KLAPPE. Gold for film "Hymne" (category: Best Commercial)
- 2010 : DIE KLAPPE. Silver for film "Hymne" (category: Best Script)
- 2010 : DIE KLAPPE. Bronze for film "Hymne" (category: Cinematography)
- 2009 : Epica Awards Gold for film "Hymne" (category: Household Maintenance)
- 2003 : AD SPOT AWARD. Gold for film "the great Dictator" (category: non profit)
- 2001 : Clio Awards. Bronze for film "Rally" (category: Cinematography)
- 2000 : INTERNATIONAL AUTOMOTIVE ADVERTISING AWARDS. Certificate of Excellence for film "Wake, Balance, Clouds QX 4 ( three films )" (category: Sports Utility)
- 2000 : INTERNATIONAL AUTOMOTIVE ADVERTISING AWARDS. Certificate of Excellence for film "Lightning, Treeshade I30 ( two films )" (category: Passenger Cars)
- 2000 : Aurora Awards. Gold Award for film "Wires" (category: Corporate Image / Promotion)
- 2000 : Aurora Awards. Gold Award for film "Infiniti Campaign 1" (category: Advertising Campaign)
- 2000 : Aurora Awards. Gold Award for film "Infiniti Campaign 2" (category: Advertising Campaign)
- 2000 : Aurora Awards. Gold Award for film "Infiniti Campaign 3" (category: Advertising Campaign)
- 2000 : [New York Festivals]. Finalist for film "Real Life" (category: Cinema Commercial)
- 1999 : Cannes Lions International Festival of Creativity. Gold Lion for film "Father and Son" (category: Public Service)
- 1997 : Cannes Lions International Advertising Festival. Finalist for film "Daydreamn" (category: Publication & Media)
- 1997 : Cannes Lions International Festival of Creativity. Finalist for film "Classroom" (category: Public Service)
- 1997 : New York Festivals. Gold for film "Dahinter steckt immer ein kluger Kopf" (category: TV / Cinema)
- 1997 : DIE KLAPPE. Gold for film "Scheiss Kinder" (category: TV / Cinema)
- 1996 : Cannes Lions International Festival of Creativity. Silver Lion for film "IDOLS" (category: Publications & Media)
- 1996 : Cannes Lions International Festival of Creativity. Silver Lion for film "Terminator" (category: Public Service)
- 1996 : DIE KLAPPE. Silver for film "Father and Son" (category: TV / Cinema)
- 1995 : Art Directors Club. Bronze for film "Vorbilder" (category: Director)
- 1994 : Cannes Lions International Festival of Creativity. Finalist for film "Mädchen" (category: TV)
- 1994 : Art Directors Club. Silver for film "Numbers" (category: TV)
- 1993 : Art Directors Club. Silver for film "Television" (category: TV / Campaign)
- 1993 : Art Directors Club. Silver for film "Diet" (category: TV / Campaign)
- 1993 : Art Directors Club. Silver for film "Mercedes Sondermodelle" (category: TV / Cinema)
- 1992 : Art Directors Club. Silver for film "Videorecorder des Jahres" (category: TV)
- 1992 : Art Directors Club. Bronze for film "Mach sein" (category: TV / Cinema)
- 1992 : Art Directors Club. Silver for film "Red Triangle" (category: TV / Cinema)
- 1992 : Art Directors Club. Silver for film "Schokoladenmeister" (category: TV)
- 1992 : Art Directors Club. Silver for film "Die Tv-Series n-tv" (category: Director)
- 1990 : Art Directors Club. Bronze for film "Blaues Kleid"
