= By the Book =

By the Book may refer to:

- By the Book (novel), a 2002 Star Trek: Enterprise novel
- "By the Book" (song), a 1999 song by Michael Peterson
- "By the Book", a first season television episode of 8 Simple Rules
- "By the Book", a controversial mission in the video game Grand Theft Auto V
- By the Book (film), a 2013 film by Milan J. Glavies
- By the Book (TV series), a 2018 American sitcom
