= AEAF =

AEAF may refer to:

- Allied Expeditionary Air Force, an expeditionary air force during World War II
- Angola Educational Assistance Fund, a Boston-based non-profit organization working with the Catholic University of Angola
- Australian Effects & Animation Festival, a festival of visual effects held in Sydney, Australia
  - AEAF Awards
- Australian Experimental Art Foundation, the former name of ACE Open, an arts organisation in Adelaide, South Australia
