= Show Yanagisawa =

Japanese film director and painter

Show Yanagisawa is a Japanese film director, painter and animation director.

== Life ==
Yanagisawa was born in Tokyo 1982. He started his career as a graffiti art live-painting artist combined with abstract painting.

In 2009, he won the Grand Prix in film category of the Asia Pacific Advertising Festival.

In 2016, he directed the Shiseido ad "High School Girl?", and 2017 SIE ad "Gravity Cat", winning the grand prix in film category at Epica Awards, and the New York Festivals. The ad also won a gold at the Cannes Lions and the Clio Awards, and appeared on several lists for best advertising spots of 2015.

In 2015, he directed the first worldwide trailer of Pokémon Go.

== Awards ==
Pocari Sweat / "Find your own way"

- D&AD 2022 —Production Design—Yellow Pencil
- D&AD 2022 —Direction—Wood Pencil
- CICLOPE ASIA 2021 —Direction— GRAND PRIX
- ADFEST 2022 —Film Craft— GRAND PRIX
- Cannes Lions 2022 —Film Craft— BRONZE
- One Show 2022 —Moving Image Craft—GOLD

Shiseido / "The Party Bus"

- Epica Awards 2018 —Film— GRAND PRIX
- Epica Awards 2018 —Direction & Cinematography— GOLD
- Epica Awards 2018 —Health & Beauty— GOLD
- ADFEST 2019 —Film Craft— GRAND PRIX
- ADFEST 2019 —Animation—GOLD
- ADFEST 2019 —Film— BRONZE
- D&AD 2019 —Cinematography—Graphite Pencil
- D&AD 2019 —Animation—Wood Pencil
- D&AD 2019 —Branded Entertainment—Wood Pencil
- D&AD 2019 —Direction—Wood Pencil
- ANDY AWARDS 2019 —Film Craft— GOLD

Shiseido / "High School Girl ?"

- Cannes Lions 2016 —Film Lions— GOLD
- Cannes Lions 2016 —Film Craft Lions— GOLD
- NEW YORK FESTIVALS 2016 —Film— Best of Show, GRAND PRIZE
- Epica Awards 2015 —Film— GRAND PRIX
- Epica Awards 2015 —Direction & Cinematography— GRAND PRIX
- Epica Awards 2015 —Luxury— GOLD
- Clio Awards 2016 —Film— GOLD
- One Show —online— GOLD
- Andy Awards 2016 —Art Direction— GOLD
- AD FEST 2016 —Film Lotus— GOLD
- Spikes Asia 2016 —Film Craft— GRAND PRIX
- Spikes Asia 2016 – Film Lotus— GOLD
- D&AD 2016 —Branded Film Content—Silver Pencil
- D&AD 2016 —Film Advertising Crafts—Wood Pencil

SIE / Gravity Rush 2 "Gravity Cat"

- Cannes Lions 2017 —Film Craft – Production Design/Art Direction— GOLD
- Cannes Lions 2017 —Film Craft – Direction— SILVER
- Cannes Lions 2017 —Film— SILVER
- Cannes Lions 2017 —Film Craft – Visual Effects— BRONZE
- Cannes Lions 2017 —Entertainment – Online Fiction— BRONZE
- Cannes Lions 2017 —Cyber – Social Video— BRONZE
- Cannes Lions 2017 —Cyber – Brand/Product— BRONZE
- One Show 2017 —Craft— GOLD
- NEW YORK FESTIVALS 2017 —Film— GRAND PRIZE
- NEW YORK FESTIVALS 2017 —Branded Entertainment— GRAND PRIZE
- NEW YORK FESTIVALS 2017 —Film Craft— GOLD
- D&AD AWARDS 2017 —Branded Film Content—Silver Pencil
- ANDY AWARDS 2017 —Advertiser— GOLD
- ANDY AWARDS 2017 —Craft— GOLD
- AD STARS —Film – Commercial Public Services— Grand Prix
- AD STARS —Film Craft – Art direction / Production design— Gold
- AD STARS —Video Stars – Branded Entertainment Videos— Gold
- AD STARS —Video Stars – Branded Viral Videos— Gold
- AD STARS —Interactive – Online ad— Silver
- Clio Awards —Film Technique – Direction— Gold
- Clio Awards —Branded Content – Film— Silver
- Clio Awards —Film – Short form— Bronze
- Clio Awards —Film Technique – Visual Effects— Bronze
- Clio Awards —Social Media – Social Video— Bronze
- ACC Creativity Awards —Online Film— Grand Prix
- ACC Creativity Awards —Interactive— Bronze
- Spikes Asia —Entertainment – Online: Fiction— Grand Prix
- Spikes Asia —Film Craft – Achievement in Production— Gold
- Spikes Asia —Film Craft – Visual Effects— Silver
- Spikes Asia —Film Craft – Production Design / Art Direction— Bronze
- Spikes Asia —Film – Media & Publications— Gold
- Spikes Asia —Digital – Brand / Product Video— Silver
- Spikes Asia —Digital – Social Video— Bronze
- Spikes Asia —Digital Craft – Video / Moving Image— Bronze
- Spikes Asia —Design – Motion Graphics Design & Animation— Bronze
- LIA Awards —Production & Post-Production – Production Design— Gold
- LIA Awards —Production & Post-Production – Direction— Silver
- LIA Awards —Production & Post-Production – Visual Effects— Silver
- LIA Awards —TV/Cinema/Online Film – Branded Content— Silver
- LIA Awards —TV/Cinema/Online Film – Recreational— Silver
- Clio Entertainment Awards —Branded Entertainment— Grand Prix
- Clio Entertainment Awards —Audio/Visual— Gold
- Clio Entertainment Awards —Visual Technique— Gold

Hakusensha / LALA GIRL'S COMIC MAGAZINE "LaLa Reports"

- AD FEST 2009 —Film Lotus— GRAND PRIX
- AD STARS 2009 —Distribution/Publication— GOLD
- AD STARS 2009 —Film/Direction— GOLD
- Spikes Asia 2009 – Publications & Media— Silver

Google / "Google Maps 8-bit for NES"

- London International Award 2012 —Branded Content— GOLD
- AD FEST 2013 —Design Lotus— GOLD
- AD STARS 2012 —Interactive— GOLD
- Spikes Asia 2012 – Publications & Media— Bronze
- Cannes Lions 2012 —Cyber Lions— Short List
- 16th Japan Media Arts Festival —Entertainment Division— Jury Award winner
- AD FEST 2014 —Film Lotus— GOLD

SUBARU / "Mini car light stream"

- AD FEST 2014 —Film Craft— Bronze
- AD STARS 2014 —Film/Direction— Bronze
- Spikes Asia 2014 – Film Lotus— Silver
- Spikes Asia 2014 – Film Craft— Bronze
- London International Award 2012 —Innovative Use of Radio— Bronze
- Spikes Asia 2012 –Digital Tools— Silver
- Yahoo! Creative Award 2014 — GRAND PRIX

Avex Music / Ai Otsuka "I Love XXX"

- 14th Japan Media Arts Festival —Entertainment Division— Jury Award winner

Universal Music / JAYED"Everybody"

- MTV Video Music Award 2010 —Best Male Video— winner

"Lost and Found" 40TH Montreal World Film Festival

- First Films World Competition— Finalist
- 19TH Shanghai International Film Festival —International Panorama—New Director
