= Love at First Sight (2011 film) =

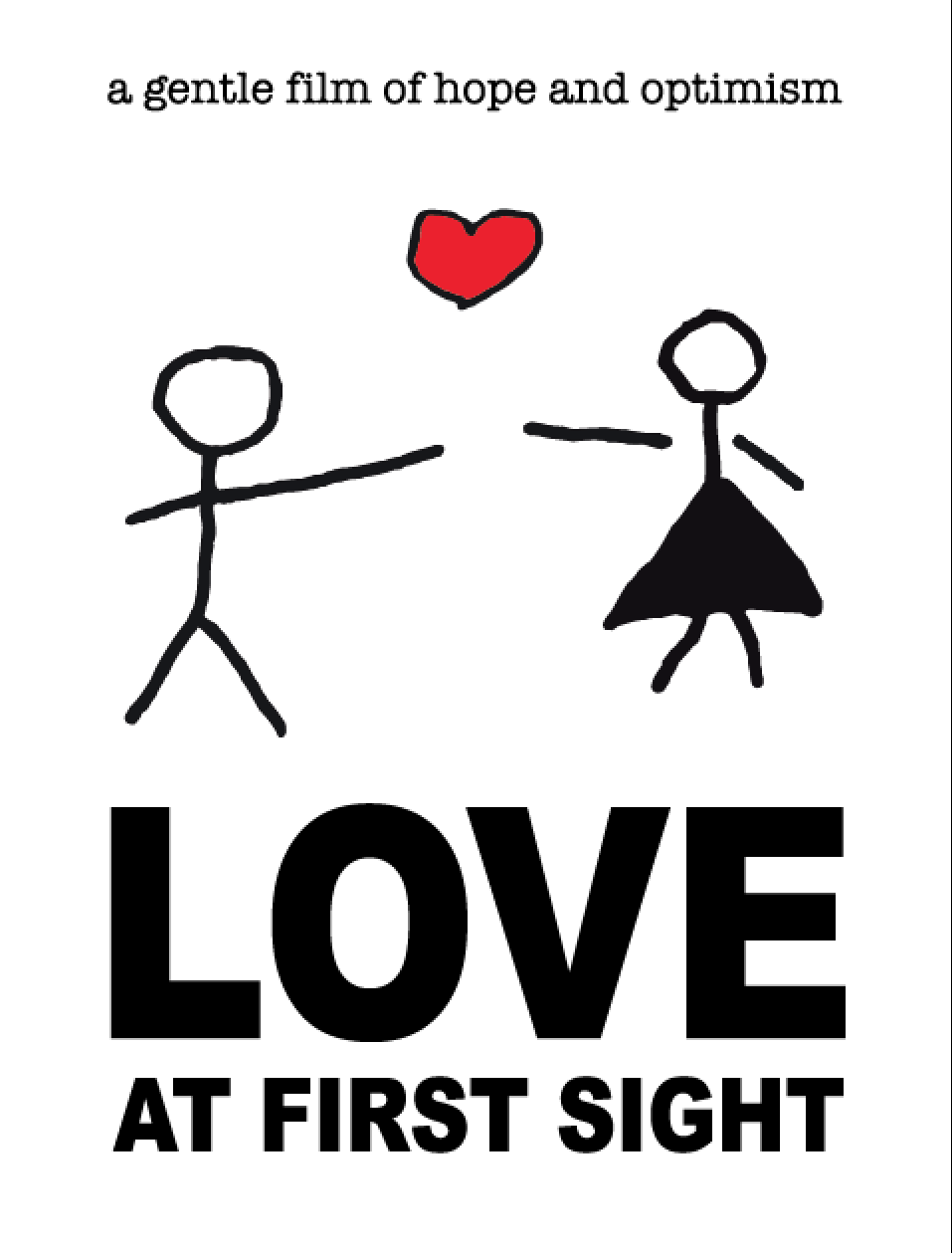
- film poster
- Directed by: Mark Playne
- Written by: Mark Playne
- Produced by: Mark Playne; Olivia Chisci
- Starring: Shane Zaza; Francesca Binefa
- Cinematography: Graeme Dunn
- Edited by: Mark Playne
- Music by: Cato Hoeben
- Production company: 1st Sight Films
- Distributed by: Shorts International
- Release date: 22 June 2011 (Palm Springs)
- Running time: 14 minutes
- Countries: Spain; United Kingdom
- Language: No Dialogue

Love at First Sight is a 2011 United Kingdom short film shot in Spain, and written, directed and produced by Mark Playne.

== Synopsis ==
The plot, told in 14 mins, tells the story of a lonely young man's attempts to attract the attention of the girl of his dreams.

== Release ==
The film premiered at the Palm Springs International ShortFest in California and was selected by more than 200 international film festivals, spanning 5 continents, and winning 76 awards, including the Audience award at Newport Beach Film Festival California, the Shin Young-kyun Arts foundation award at Asiana Film festival in Korea and best début film at Rutger Hauer's "I've seen Films" film festival in Italy. The film was nominated for best comedy at the Shanghai International Film Festival.

== Cast ==
- Shane Zaza as S.L.Y.M.
- Francesca Binefa as Girl on Balcony
- Manuela Martinez Camacho as Lady with the red broom
- Luis Moreno Frenandez as Man on Balcony
- Nacho Pardo Moreno as Blind Girl's brother
- Carolina Diaz Rosada as Humming Vocals

The male lead Shane Zaza (lead in David Hare's Behind the Beautiful Flowers at London's Royal National Theatre) won two awards for his performance in this film, both in India: for Best Actor by the Gujarat International Film Festival, and for Best Actor at the Imphal International Short Film Festival. The female lead Francesca Binefa won Best Actress at the Gujarat International Film Festival.

== Production ==
The film was made with the production company 1st Sight Films.

After international screenings in 2011, the director took the project back into editing where he cut 15% of the film and re-scored two major sections of music. The film was remixed by the National Film Award-winning Sinoy Joseph at QLABS in Mumbai. The updated film premiered at the Jaipur International Film Festival in 2012.

The film was signed by Shorts International/ShortsTV for distribution and was released on iTunes in 2015. The film has screened nationally in India twice on NDTV prime TV and it was screened in-flight as "short of the month" on Asiana Airlines during March 2013. A 35mm print of the film with 5.1 sound has been selected for the BFI National Archive.

The film is also known by its Spanish title Amor a Primera Vista.

=== Music ===
The music was scored in Sevilla and London by the composer Cato Hoeben. The music was recognised when the film won Best Short at the Parma International Music Festival in Italy. The music was rescored by the composer Rob Steel at the Sound of Silent Film Festival at the Music Box Theatre (Chicago) in Chicago in 2014 when the orchestra played live to the film.

=== Cinematography ===
The cinematographer Graeme Dunn was awarded Best Cinematography at the Fargo Film Festival in the USA.

=== Location ===
The film was shot in Spain at the seaside fishing port of Villajoyosa, the story the location's discovery was featured in the Ryan Air in-flight magazine in February 2015. The cafe scene was shot 16 km away in the mountain town of Sella, Alicante.

== See also ==
- Love at first sight

== Recognition ==
=== Awards and nominations ===
2016

- Best Director – Miraj International Short Film Festival 2016 (India);
- Best Cinematography – Miraj International Short Film Festival 2016 (India);

2015

- Best Film – International Film Festival for Documentary, Short, and Comedy 2015 (Indonesia);
- International Award of Outstanding Excellence – Short Film – International Film Festival for Documentary, Short, and Comedy 2015 (Indonesia);
- Best Foreign – Another Independent International Film Festival 2015 (USA);
- Best Foreign Language Film – Route 66 Film Festival 2015 (USA);
- Best Film – Free Theme Category – 2nd Prize – International Short Film Festival "Cerano Film" 2015 (Italy);
- Diploma of the Festival – International Short Film Festival "The Unprecedented Cinema" 2015 (Estonia);
- Best Art Direction Award – Cinema Monster Film Festival 2015 (USA);
- Best Short International Film – Fest Film Kosova "Goddess on the Throne" 2015 (Kosovo);
- Best Cinematography Award – Fabriano Film Fest 2015 (Italy);
- Best International Film – 3rd Prize – Ahmednagar International Short Film Festival 2015 (India);
- Audience Choice Award – Imago Film Festival 2015 (USA)

2014

- Best Film Award – International Festival of Short Films – BEINTEN 2014 (Russia);
- Audience Choice Award – Sandpoint Film Festival 2014 (USA);
- Best Short – Jury Award – 2014 YES Film Festival (USA);
- Best Short Film – Art Short – International Film Festival "Prvi kadar" 2014 (Bosnia and Herzegovina);
- "Film That Changes Perspective" Award – International Film Festival "Seize This Day With Me/Seize The Film!" 2014 (Serbia);
- Best International Film – Fiction Category – Cinéphile 2014 (India);
- Best Short Film – "Corti in Cortile" International Short Film Festival 2014 (Italy);
- Best Short Film – International Competition – São Tomé FestFilm 2014 (Portugal);
- Best Film – Professional Category – Paraj Mumbai Short Film Festival 2014 (India);
- Best Director – Professional Category – Paraj Mumbai Short Film Festival 2014 (India);
- Grand Prix of the Festival – Festival International Du Film De Vébron 2014 (France);
- Audience Award – Shorts@Fringe 2014 (Portugal);
- Panorama Audience Award – ODA Tetova International Film Festival 2014 (Macedonia);
- Best Cinematography – Narrative Short Category – Fargo Film Festival 2014 (USA);
- Best Short. Sweet. Film – Short Sweet Film Fest 2014 (USA);
- Best Short Fiction Film – International Category – Darbhanga International Film Festival 2014 (India);

2013

- Appreciation Award for Excellence in Short Film Making - International Film Festival of Kanyakumari 2013 (India);
- Best Short Movie Award - Parma International Film Music Festival 2013 (Italy);
- People's Choice Award - Best Film - Vagrant Film Festival 2013 (Belarus);
- Honorary Mention - Fiction Category - Del Festival Internacional Del Cortometraje FIC 2013 (Argentina);
- "Grand Prix - the film" Award - Krivoy Rog Film Festival "Cinema Under the Stars" 2013 (Ukraine);
- Best Film - Jury Award - Heathcote Film Festival 2013 (Australia);
- Best Short FICEE 2013 - Festival Internacional de Cine Educativo y Espiritual De Ciudad Rodrigo (Spain);
- Best Film - Audience Award - International Short Film Festival of India (India) 2013.

2012

- Best Short - Audience Award - Newport Beach Film Festival, Los Angeles (USA) 2012;
- Shin Young-kyun foundation Arts and Culture award - Asiana International Short Film Festival (Korea);
- Best Debut Film - Jury Award - Rutger Hauer's I’ve Seen Films International Film Festival (Italy);

2011

- Best Short - Jury Award - Peloponnesian International Film Festival (Greece);
