= Anja Lundholm =

German writer

- Born: Helga Erdtmann; 28 April 1918; Düsseldorf , North Rhine-Westphalia, Germany
- Died: 4 August 2007 (aged 89); Frankfurt am Main, Hesse, Germany
- Occupation: novelist
- Writing career
- Genre: Prose
- Notable works: Jene Tage in Rom (1982); Das Höllentor (1988)

Anja Lundholm (born as Helga Erdtmann, 28 April 1918, Düsseldorf – 4 August 2007, Frankfurt), popularly known by her pen names Ann Berkeley and Alf Lindström, was a German novelist and holocaust survivor.

== Biography ==
Lundholm was the daughter of Erich Erdtmann, a German pharmacist from Krefeld and a member of the Schutzstaffel, Elisabeth Blumenthal, who came from a wealthy Jewish family of bankers in Darmstadt., and the grandmother of Nico Beyer, a video artist, music video director, and commercial director. In the years 1936–1939 she studied in Berlin.

In 1941, she fled to Italy with the help of forged papers and established relations with members of the resistance movement in Rome. Arrested, in March 1944, she was sent to the Ravensbrück concentration camp. She managed to escape from the death march and ended up in the British army in Lüneburg with the help of the Red Cross. After the war, she worked as a translator and journalist for the British press.

Lundholm authored several books, including the memoirs Das Höllentor ("The Gates of Hell", 1988) that narrates her imprisonment in Ravensbrück concentration camp from spring 1944 until escape in early May 1945.

== Awards and honors ==
- 1970: Kulturpreis of the Federal Foreign Office of the Federal Republic of Germany
- 1986: Förderpreis of the Deutsche Akademie für Sprache und Dichtung
- 1991: Special Prize for the Erich Maria Remarque Peace Prize
- 1993: Johanna Kirchner Medaille
- 1997: Hans Sahl Preis for Das Höllentor
- 1998: BDS Literature Prize
- 1998: Goethe Plaque of the City of Frankfurt
- 1998: Wilhelm-Leuschner Medal
- 2003: Niederrheinischer Literaturpreis

== Publications ==
=== Novels ===
==== Autobiographical novels ====
- Halb und halb ("Half and Half", 1966)
- Morgengrauen ("Dawn", 1970)
- Der Grüne ("The Green", 1972)
- Jene Tage in Rom ("Those Days in Rome", 1982)
- Geordnete Verhältnisse ("Orderly Conditions", 1983)
- Die äußerste Grenze ("The Outermost Limit", 1988)
- Das Höllentor ("The Gates of Hell", 1988)
- Im Netz ("Online", 1991)

==== Solo novels ====
- Ich liebe mich, liebst du mich auch? ("I Love Myself, Do You Love Me Too?", 1971) as Ann Berkeley.
- Zerreißprobe ("Test of Endurance", 1974)
- Nesthocker ("Nest Stool", 1977)
- Mit Ausblick zum See ("With a View of the Lake", 1979)
- Narziß postlagernd ("Narcissus Post-Bearing", 1985)

=== Translations ===
==== as Alf Lindström ====
- Peter Baker, Das große Spiel (trans. The Great Game) (Zürich: 1970)
- Peter Baker, Privatklinik Valetudo (trans. Private Clinic Valetudo) (Zürich: 1971)
- Richard Beilby, Keinen Orden für Aphrodite (trans. No Order for Aphrodite) (Zürich: 1970)
- Gordon Thomas, Die Feuerwolke (trans. The Fire Cloud) (Zürich: 1970)

==== as herself ====
- Mala Rubinstein, Schön und charmant mit Mala Rubinstein (trans. Beautiful and Charming with Mala Rubinstein) (Zürich: 1975)
