= UK Film Festival =

Annual film festival in London, England

- Location: London, England
- Founded: 2011; 15 years ago
- Website: ukfilmfestival.com

The UK Film Festival (UKFF), founded in 2011, is an annual film festival held every November in London, England. The festival provides a platform for emerging filmmakers while also presenting works by established directors.

== History ==
Founded in 2011 by Mahdi H. Nejad and festival director Murray Woodfield, the festival holds its screenings at Close-Up Cinema in Shoreditch and the Soho Hotel.

Its programming has included films that later won Academy Awards, including The Broken Circle Breakdown (2012), Ida (2013), The Phone Call (2013) and Stutterer (2015). BAFTA Award winners include Operator (2015) and 73 Cows (2018). The festival has also hosted the world premiere of Esio Trot (2015), and the European premiere of Billy Knight (2025).

Notable winners include Willem Dafoe, Timothy Spall, Oscar Isaac, and Olivia Colman.

=== Screenplay competition ===
In addition to the festival, the organisers run an annual script competition.

The winning script of the 2012 edition, Mike, was later co-produced by the UK Film Festival and won the Crystal Bear for Best Short Film at the 2014 Berlin International Film Festival, the first British film to win this award. The following year, the winning screenplay, A Confession, was made into a film and, among other awards, also received the Crystal Bear at the 2015 Berlin International Film Festival. Both films were directed by Petros Silvestros and achieved worldwide distribution through Interfilm.

== Reception ==
The festival has been featured in the following lists:

- "The top UK film festivals" – Metro
- "The best film festivals in London" – ThatsUp
- "UK’s best indie film fests" – FilmDaily
- "The best UK festivals" – London & Partners
- "The best film festivals in London" – The Clermont
- "7 best film festivals in London" – Visit London
- "The 8 best film festivals in the UK" – El Ibérico
- "10 of the best film festivals in London" – Secret London

== Awards ==
Award categories include:

- Best Feature Film
- Best Feature Documentary
- Best Short Film
- Best Short Documentary
- Best British Short
- Best Animation
- Best Music Video
- Best Student Film

Special awards for excellence are also presented.
