= Melbourne WebFest =

Australian web series festival

Logo for the WebFest, used since 2019

The Melbourne WebFest is an international web series festival based in Melbourne, Australia. It was the first of its kind in the country. It focuses on web series from around the world, with individual recognitions for genres including fantasy and science fiction, nonfiction, drama, comedy, and suspense. Panels on the pitching, production and marketing of web series also take place at the festival.

== History ==
The Melbourne WebFest was founded in 2013 by Steinar Ellingsen, Ashlee Thomas, Max Retro, Alexander Hipwell and Ingvill Oddsen in response to the development of web series in Australia. It was inspired by and is supported by the Los Angeles Web Series Festival. It was initially a one-day event targeted toward series producers, but became a three-day festival aimed at the general public by its second year.

In 2016, the awards introduced the Pitch Perfect event, a live pitching competition in partnership with ABC iview.

== Awards ==
Awards include the Grand Jury Award for which the winner receives paid trips and entry to other international web series festivals, and the People's Choice award which gives a cash prize. The ABC has offered sponsored awards that give the winner direct licensing to the ABC iview platform.
