= By the Book (film) =

2013 short film by Milan J. Glavies

By the Book is a 2013 comedy short film directed and written by Milan J. Glavies.

== Synopsis ==
Still reeling from being dumped, best friends Leo and Kate decide the best way to get over their exes is to rebound with each other. With a misguided self-help book as their handbook to happiness, the pair find love where they least expected.

== Reception ==
The film was named Best Supporting Short Film at the Short Sweet Film Festival, named Best Comedy at the Film Outside the Frame Festival, and was an Official Selection at the L.A. Indie Film Festival. The film’s director received a nomination for Best Director at the Film Outside the Frame Festival.

== Cast ==
- Victoria Cyr as Karen Molkovski
- Christian Edsall as Leo Merritt
- Brenda Kate as Kate Lowry
- Trip Langley as Miles Sterling
- Vanessa Patel as Jo Patel
