= Short Sweet Film Fest =

Film festival held in Cleveland, Ohio

- Status: active
- Genre: film festival
- Location: Cleveland
- Country: United States
- Years active: 13–14
- Inaugurated: 2012
- Founder: Mike Suglio
- Website: www.shortsweetfilmfest.com

The Short Sweet Film Fest is an annual short film festival held in Cleveland, Ohio.

== Background ==
The festival was found by Mike Suglio in 2012, and approximately 100 films are showcased each year. The first festival was held at Market Garden Brewery in the Ohio City neighborhood of Cleveland. It is currently held at the Alex Theater in The 9 Cleveland.

Films screened at the festival include By the Book, Fixed, Love at First Sight and The Things My Father Never Taught Me.

A unique feature of the festival is that live music follows each day of the festival.
