= Madrid Fashion Film Festival =

Annual film festival

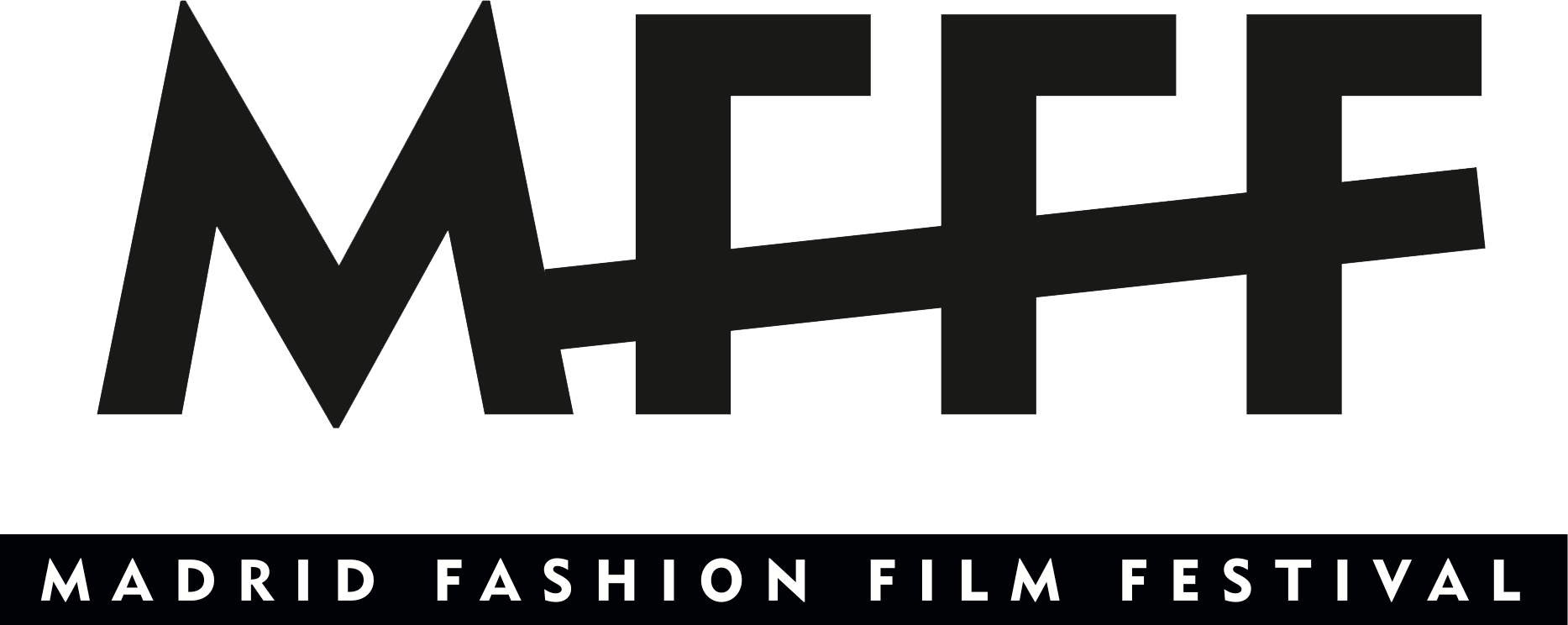
- Location: Madrid, Spain
- Established: 2013

Madrid Fashion Film Festival (MadridFFF) was the first annual fashion film festival held in Madrid, Spain, which showcases films related to the world of fashion. The festival was held at Palacio de Comunicaciones Cibeles. It was created in 2013, to showcase annual fashion films made by both professionals and new creators within the fashion industry.

== History ==
Madrid Fashion Film Festival was founded in 2013. The festival exhibits fashion films as well as a conference focusing on filmmaking in fashion marketing. To conference focuses on the meaning of fashion films and their place as a film genre. The first edition took place in Cineteca Matadero Madrid from October 28 to November 3, 2013, and it is now hosted in Palacio Cibeles.

== Awards & Categories ==
There are two categories in MadridFFF. The first is for professionals from the fashion industry and the second is for new creators in fashion, design, audiovisual, advertising, and marketing students. An out-of-competition program includes fashion film and documentary screenings. During the first edition the documentary, "Elio Berhanyer, maestro del dise,ño" (Elio Berhanyer: master of design, 2013) was shown. In the second edition, MadridFFF held the national premiere of the documentary "Advanced Style" (2014).

=== Professional Awards ===
There is a section open to professionals from the fashion design, audiovisual, communications, and advertising worlds. This section is divided into merit categories. In the second edition, with the collaboration from Editorial Group Condé Nast, another category was created, for the best director of fashion films for a brand.

- Best Fashion Film.
- Jury’s Award to the best fashion film produced in Spain..
- Best Photography.
- Best Art Direction.
- Best Performance.
- Best Branded fashion film by Condé Nast.

=== New Talent Awards ===
Another section is open to new talents and students. A second award was added to this category during the second edition with the H&M sponsorship through which H&M and MadridFFF launched a competition to choose and produce the best creative concept for H&M.

- Best Fashion Film by New Talent.
- H&M Award for Best Creative Concept by New Talent.

== Editions ==
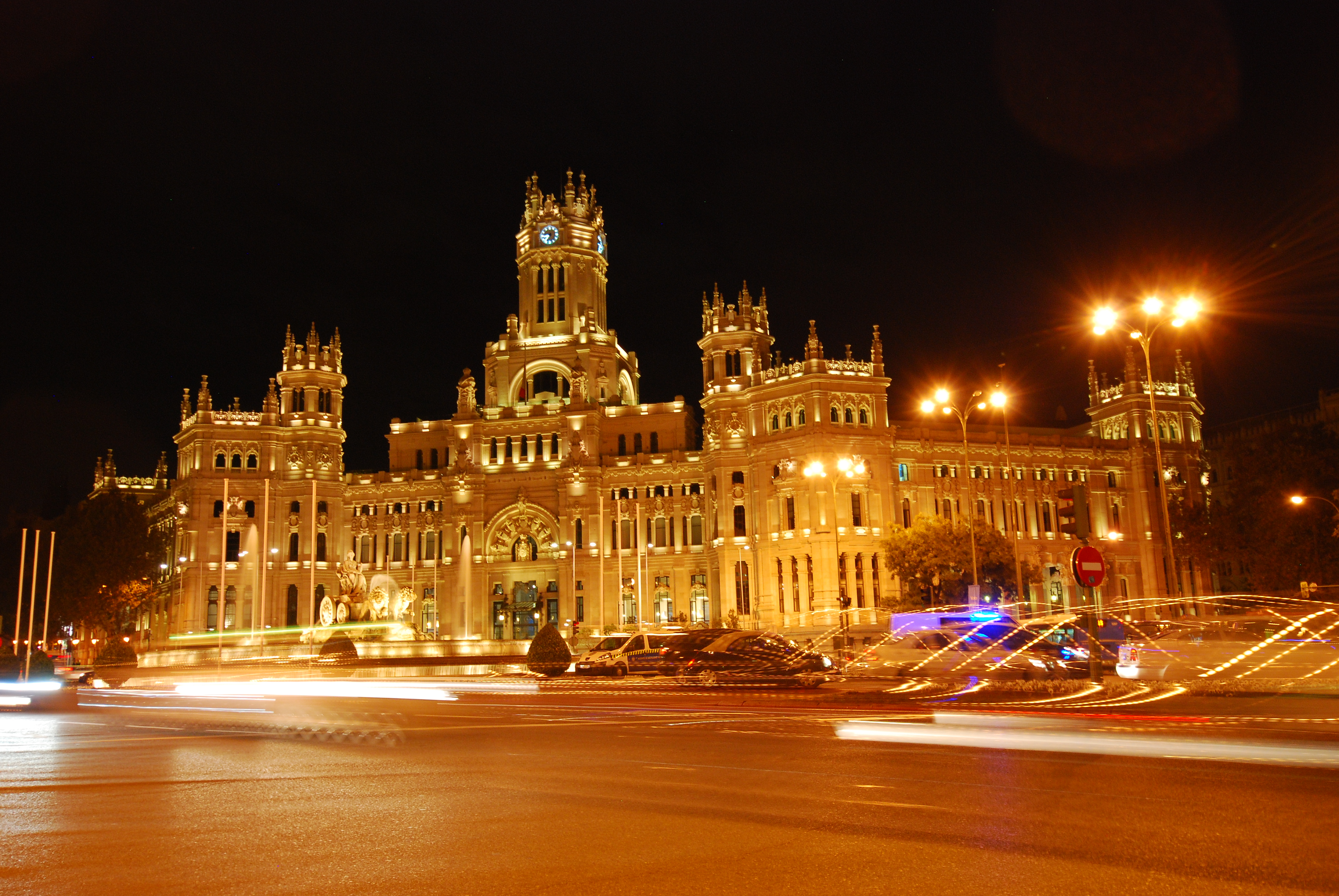
Palacio de Comunicaciones, festival headquarters during second edition of MadridFFF.

=== First Edition ===
The first edition of Madrid Fashion Film Festival was held from October 28 to November 3, 2013, at Matadero Madrid Cultural Center.

==== Jury ====
- David Delfín, fashion designer.
- Empar Prieto, editor-in-chief of SModa.
- Eugenia de la Torriente, editor-in-chief of Harper’s Bazaar Spain.
- Eugenio Recuenco, photographer and filmmaker.
- Laura Ponte, model and jewellery design.
- Manolo Moreno, creative director.
- Rodrigo Cortés, film director.
- Rossy de Palma, model and actress.

==== Award-winning fashion films ====
- Best Fashion Film: Hors D'Ouvre by Monica Menez.
- Best Fashion Film 2016: The Silent Conversation by William Williamson
- Best Photography: Don't be Cruel by Diana Kunst.
- Best Art Direction: Hors D'Ouvre by Monica Menez.
- Best Branded Fashion Film: Vera by Rustam Ilyasov.
- Best Performance: Escape from Mondays by Diego Hurtado.
- Best Editorial Fashion Film: Volcano by Luca Finotti.
- Mejor Fashion Film Nacional: Don't be cruel by Diana Kunst.
- Best New Talent: La otra por sí misma by Julia Martos.

=== Second Edition ===
The second edition was held from 3 to 6 November 2014 in Palacio de Comunicaciones Cibeles.

==== Jury ====
- Carmen March, creative director of Pedro del Hierro.
- Debra Smith, director of New Projects in Condé Nast Spain.
- Donald Schneider, creative director of H&M.
- Elena Ochoa-Foster, modern art curator.
- Eugenio Recuenco, photographer and filmmaker.
- Isabel Coixet, film director.
- Juan García Escudero, creative director of Leo Burnett Iberia.
- Laura Ponte, model and jewellery design.
- Rossy de Palma, actress and model.
- Ruth Hogben, photographer and filmmaker.

==== Award-winning fashion films ====
- Best Fashion Film: Aspirational by Matthew Frost.
- Best Photography: Dreamers by Santiago & Mauricio.
- Best Art Direction: The Sound of COS by Lernet & Sander.
- Best Branded Fashion Film Auteur by Condé Nast: Bruno Aveillan.
- Best Performance: Kirsten Dunst by Aspirational de Matthew Frost.
- Mejor Fashion Film Nacional: Créme Caramel by Canada.
- Best New Talent: Missing Tiger by David Zimmermann.
- H&M Award Best Creative Concept by New Talent: H&M Challenge de Javiera Huidobro.
