= Sarajevo Fashion Film Festival =

Annual film festival in Sarajevo, Bosnia

- Location: Sarajevo, Bosnia and Herzegovina
- Founded: 2015; 11 years ago
- Language: International
- Website: www.sfff.ba

The Sarajevo Fashion Film Festival (Bosnian: Sarajevski festival modnog filma / Сарајевски фестивал модног филма) is an international film festival held annually in Sarajevo, Bosnia and Herzegovina. It exclusively showcases fashion films, advertising films, music videos and short documentaries on the fashion industry. It was established in 2015 by the Consortio Civium Invictum Foundation in cooperation with the London Fashion Week, Paris Fashion Week and the Madrid Fashion Film Festival.

== Format ==
SFFF was created in order to showcase and exhibit the new fashion cinematographic genre to wider audiences as well to create an institutional background to the increasing number of fashion films produced every year by fashion magazines and fashion production companies. The festival is held in December of every year and lasts for two days. It is made up of a competition and non-competition programme. As of 2017, the former is divided into 14 categories and includes the Dove of Sarajevo award for best overall fashion film. Further categories include Best Fashion Film, Best Music Video, Best National Film, Best New Talent, Best Photography, Best Actor, Best Actress, Best Cinematography, Best Costume Design, Best Major Brand Production, Best Make-up and Hair, Best Story, Best Visual and Special Effect and Best Documentary. The maximum length of the films shown in the competitive selection is 20 minutes.

== Award winners ==
Selected categories:

=== Dove of Sarajevo ===
Year	English title	Original title	Director(s)	Country
2016	The Good Italian II	—N/a	Emanuele Di Bacco	Italy
2017	Pearl	—N/a	Brandon Jameson	USA

=== Best Fashion Film ===
Year	English title	Original title	Director(s)	Country
2016	Thirty-Six Hours	—N/a	Nowness	United Kingdom
2017	The Alphabet of Ben Sirach	—N/a	Jana Nedzvetkaya	Russia

=== Best Music Video ===
Year	English title	Original title	Director(s)	Country
2016	Myth HumanProduce	—N/a	Manfre & Iker Iturria	Spain
2017	Film Princy	—N/a	Metin Kuru	Turkey

=== Best National Film ===
Year	English title	Original title	Director(s)	Country
2016	Diva	—N/a	Belma Tvico	Bosnia and Herzegovina
2017	Nature Needs You	—N/a	Mark Peace	Australia

=== Best Young Director ===
Year	English title	Original title	Director(s)	Country
2016	Pippin and the Pursuits of Life	—N/a	Femke Huurdeman	Canada
2017	Café Midnight	—N/a	Anastasia Venkova	Russia

=== Best Fashion Documentary ===
Year	English title	Original title	Director(s)	Country
2017	Bianca	—N/a	Adil Oğuz valizade	Turkey

=== Best Cinematography ===
Year	English title	Original title	Director(s)	Country
2017	The Alphabet of Ben Sirach	—N/a	Jana Nedzvetkaya	Russia

=== Best Actor ===
Year	English title	Original title	Actor	Country
2017	Scappino	—N/a	Emanuele Filiberto of Savoy, Prince of Venice	Italy

=== Best Actress ===
Year	English title	Original title	Actress	Country
2017	Bello	—N/a	Nina de Lianin	Serbia

=== Best Costume Design ===
Year	English title	Original title	Designer	Country
2017	Casamorati	—N/a	Michele Bizzi	Italy

=== Best Major Brand Production ===
Year	English title	Original title	Designer/Brand	Country
2017	The Painting	—N/a	Boldizsár CR / Vogue Italia	Italy

== See also ==
- List of fashion film festivals
