= New Renaissance Film Festival =

Annual film festival in London, England

- Location: London, England
- Founded: 2015; 11 years ago
- Directors: Jan Hendrik Verstraten; Massimo Barbato
- Website: newrenaissancefilmfest.com

The New Renaissance Film Festival (NRFF) is an annual film festival held in London, England. Founded in 2015, the festival focuses on independent cinema, showcasing feature-length and short films across various genres.

== History ==
Established in 2015, the festival hosts its screenings at Close-Up Cinema in Shoreditch, while the awards ceremony is held at the Courthouse Hotel in Soho.

Past award recipients include Sarah Snook, Rachel Shenton and George MacKay. Notable alumni include Tatiana Maslany and Whoopi Goldberg.

== Reception ==
Metro listed the festival among the "Top UK film festivals you need to know about", and El Ibérico named it one of "The eight best film festivals in the UK".

== Awards ==
Awards are presented in the following categories:

- Best Feature Film
- Best Director
- Best Actor
- Best Actress
- Best Cinematography
- Best Music Score
- Best Documentary
- Best Emerging Talent Award (Note: The festival awards a total of £2,500 in cash prizes in the Emerging Talent category.)
- Best International Short
- Best UK Short
- Best Animation Short
- Best Experimental Short
- Best Music Video
- Best Dance Film
- Best Choreography
- Best 3 Minute Short
- Best Drama Short
- Best Thriller Short
- Best Sci-Fi Short
- Best Fantasy Short
