= Groover =

Record Label

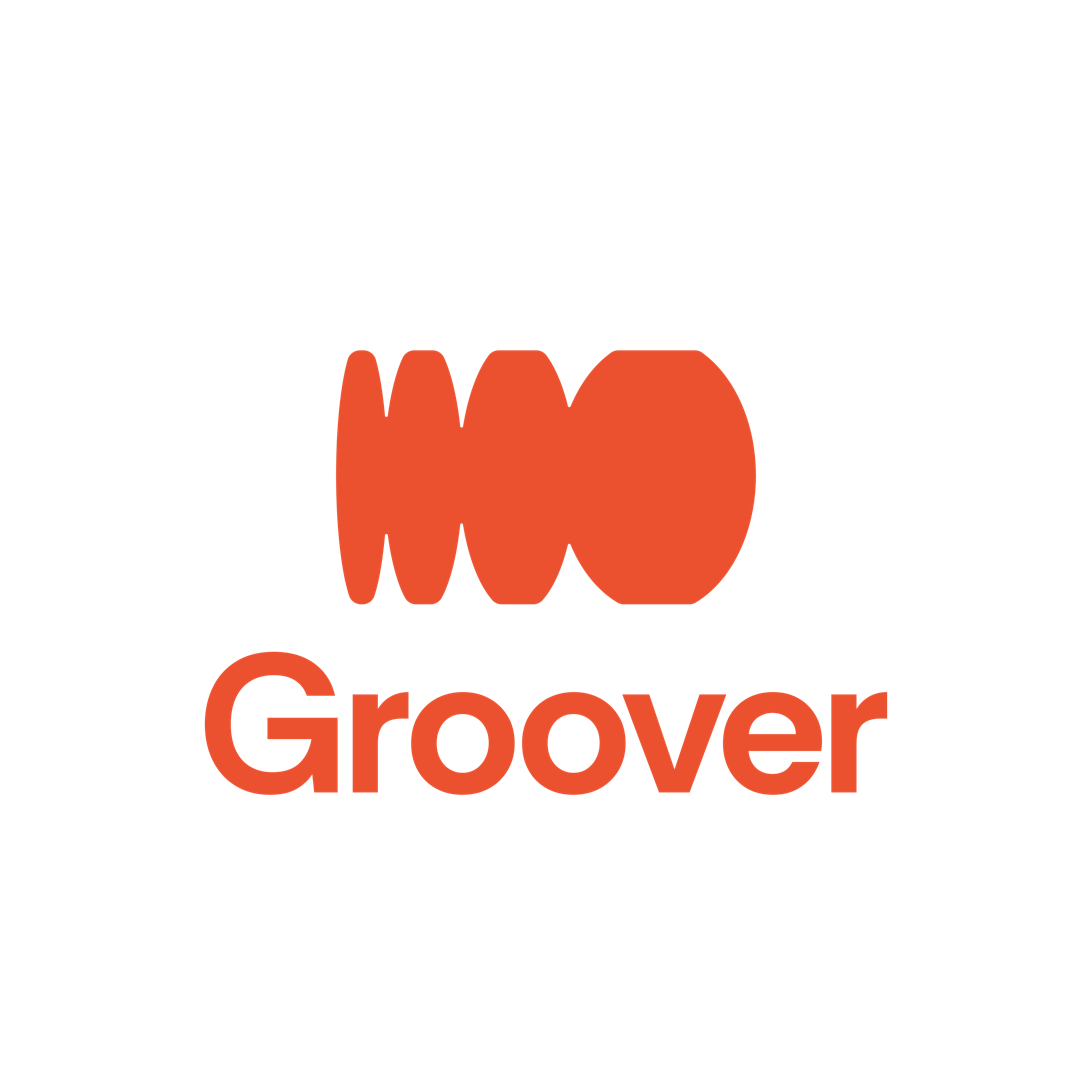
- Company type: SAS
- Industry: Music Tech, Artist Services
- Founded: February 12, 2018
- Founders: Dorian Perron; Romain Palmieri; Rafaël Cohen
- Headquarters: Paris, New York
- Area served: Worldwide
- Services: Music promotion
- Website: groover.co

Groover is an online platform, record label and distributor, connecting artists and musicians with music professionals and media outlets. The service was founded in 2018 in France and operates from offices in Paris and New York.

The platform has over 3,000 active contacts, including SPIN Magazine and Sofar Sounds. Groover uses a micro-payment model.

Among the platform's over 500,000 regular users are record labels such as Ninja Tune, Ba Da Bing Records, Dance To The Radio, Roche Musique, Wagram Music, Secret City Records, and artists including Bonobo, Michael Bolton, Aloe Blacc, Haddaway, Passenger, La Femme and Chinese Man.

== History ==
Groover was launched at the MaMA Music Convention in October 2018. It was co-founded by Dorian Perron, Romain Palmieri, and Rafaël Cohen while they were students at UC Berkeley. Initially growing in France, the company has expanded to the United States, Canada, the United Kingdom, Brazil, Italy, and elsewhere in Europe.

In March 2019, Groover was part of the Business France delegation at the South by Southwest (SXSW) festival.

In June 2019, Groover raised €1.3 million from various angel investors.

In April 2021, Groover acquired the platform Soonvibes, which had 70,000 users at the time, in order to strengthen its community in the electronic music space.

In November 2021, Groover announced a €6 million funding round from Bpifrance Creative Industries and Partech.

Between 2023 and 2025, Groover entered strategic partnerships with major artist service providers, including CD Baby, TuneCore, SoundCloud, UnitedMasters, Symphonic Distribution, Audiomack and SACEM.

In February 2024, Groover announced a Series A funding round of $8 million from OneRagTime, Trind, Techmind, and Mozza Angels.

== Function ==
Using a micro-payment system, professionals listen to tracks and provide written feedback. These professionals retain full editorial independence and are under no obligation to share the track or contact the artist.

== Awards ==
- 2nd Prize for Music Innovation 2023 from the Centre national de la musique (France)
- "Future Creator" Award at the Petit Poucet Competition 2019
- Jury's Special Mention at the MaMA Invent 2019 competition
- 1st Prize for Digital Initiative in Culture, Communication & Media 2019 awarded by Audiens
- "Start-up of the Year" at the Social Music Awards 2020
- French American Entrepreneurship Award 2022 at the French Consulate in New York
