= El Ibérico =

El Ibérico Gratuito
- Type: Regional free daily newspaper
- Format: Tabloid
- Founded: 2010
- Language: Spanish
- Headquarters: London
- Website: www.eliberico.com

El Ibérico is a free newspaper printed and distributed in London, England. The newspaper has fortnightly editions and is London's only Spanish language newspaper.

== History ==
El Ibérico was founded in 2010 by Paco de la Coba. During the first year of activity, sales were profitable enough to pay for the next edition and so on.

In 2015, the distribution of El Ibérico started to grow outside of London to cities such as Leeds, Manchester, Brighton, Dublin and Edinburgh.

In July 2016, El Ibérico was the first news outlet to talk about the Byron Hamburgers' scandal that involved trapping illegal immigrants into a fake job application to feed a government raid on illegal immigration.

== Editorial ==
Whilst focussing on London's Hispanic community, the newspaper prints stories about both the UK and Spain.

== Distribution ==
Like most other free newspaper publications in London, it is mainly distributed outside tube stations, mainly around the "ethnic enclaves" of the city. The newspaper also gets circulation in Spanish restaurants, Spanish-speaking embassies, and regular commercial outlets willing to distribute it. Since 2015, the newspaper is distributed in other major cities of the United Kingdom.
