= Animaze Montreal International Film Festival =

Annual film festival in Montreal, Quebec

Animaze - Montreal International Animation Film Festival is an annual film festival in Montreal, Quebec, Canada dedicated to the celebration of animation in all forms. Now going into its 8th edition, the next edition will take place August 2020 ANIMAZE presents animated film of all genres from around the world which may have limited theatrical releases.

The festival's premier edition was held on November 18–20, 2011 and was built around core events which all subsequent editions will contain:

- An international film festival and industry conference including masterclasses
- Augmented and virtual reality content and symposium and 360° Dome
- An international student short film contest

== International film contest ==
Animaze's first objective is to bring animation professionals from around the world together, to showcase animated content from around the world in the hub of animation industry. Animaze awards a various prize to the winning films as determined by a panel of judges and a "Audience Favorite" as determined by the viewers.

== Saturday morning cartoon charity show ==
In an effort to give back to the community, Animaze Festival dedicates one of its shows for a charity screening that pays tribute to an important era in North American animation, the Saturday Morning Cartoon. Each year, Animaze selects a year and a specific television network and highlights the best shows from that line-up with all the proceeds going towards the charity of their choice.

== Student shorts contest ==
To help get local talent involved in the festival, Animaze holds a Student Shorts contest for animation schools in and around the Montreal area. This event pits school vs. school in an old fashion battle-royal. Each school must submit a collection of shorts from its student body and the schools are judged by their cumulative submission. The judges for this event are representatives from each of the schools in which they rate all the shorts entered except those from their own institution. The school whose combined shorts acquire the highest grade wins the top prize which is an Oscar type trophy and bragging rights for the year as the "Best Animation School" in town.

The contest also recognizes and honors the three individual shorts that scored the highest overall mark. The individual winners receive an award certificate and prizes to help them in the progression of their studies.

The grand prize awarded is held in high regards by the film schools as they are not being judged or awarded a prize from the Animaze Festival but rather from amongst their peers and it is the other schools that declare the winning animation program.

== Master class ==
Animaze Festival invites a guest director to address important issues within the animation industry. The lecture is preceded by a feature which the guest speaker was involved with.

== Classic film tribute ==
To honor animated films of yesteryear, Animaze plays tribute to ground-breaking film which is celebrating an anniversary by screening it again for its fans on the big screen. If possible, the film will be shown in it original 35mm and people involved in the film's creation will be invited to the event.

== Events summary 2011 ==
International Film Contest Entries:

- Jez Jerzy: The Movie (Poland)
- No Longer Human (Japan)
- Fimfarum 3: Third Time Lucky (Czech Republic)
- First Squad (Japan)
- Metropia (Sweden)
- Viva the 'Nam (USA)
- Redline (Japan)

Grand Prize Winner: Metropia (Sweden)

Audience Favorite Winner: Redline (Japan)

Saturday Morning Cartoon Charity show: CBS's 1986 line-up featuring Berenstain Bears, Teen Wolf, Galaxy High and Pee Wee's Playhouse

Classic Film Tribute: 30th Anniversary Screening of Heavy Metal with special guest director Gerald Potterton

Student Shorts Animation Contest:

Participating Schools: Concordia University, UQAM, Algonquin College, Collège de Bois-de-Boulogne, Centre NAD and Cégep du Vieux Montréal

Winning School: Collège de Bois-de-Boulogne

Top Three Individual Shorts:

- 1st Place - –Il était encore une fois by Roxanne Baril-Monfette from Cégep du Vieux Montréal
- 2nd Place - Foxball by Gabriel Gagné from Centre NAD
- 3rd Place - Albert L’as de L’air by Yves Paradis from Cégep du Vieux Montréal

Master Class: Charity screening of the documentary Freleng: Frame by Frame including a lecture by director Greg Ford

Special Shows

- International classic film screenings: Free Jimmy (Norway) and One Night in One City (Czech Republic)
