= Sidewalk Film Festival =

Annual film festival in Alabama, U.S.

- Location: Birmingham, Alabama, US
- Founded: 1999
- Most recent: 2025
- Festival date: August 24 - 30, 2026
- Language: International
- Website: http://www.sidewalkfest.com

Current: 28th
- 29th 27th

The Sidewalk Film Festival is an annual film festival taking place during the last weekend in August in the Theatre District of Birmingham, Alabama, since 1999. The festival typically screens at seven venues located within downtown Birmingham, featuring the restored Alabama Theatre, a 2,200 seat movie palace built by Paramount in 1927, and multiple screening rooms in the Alabama School of Fine Arts.

In 2006, the Sidewalk Moving Picture Festival recognized writer/director John Sayles and producer Maggie Renzi for their more than two decades of collaboration in independent film, which includes such acclaimed indie classics as The Brother From Another Planet, Passion Fish, Lone Star, and the Sidewalk 2004 Opening Night Film, Silver City.

In 2005, Sidewalk honored actor John C. Reilly with the inaugural Spirit of Sidewalk award.

== History ==
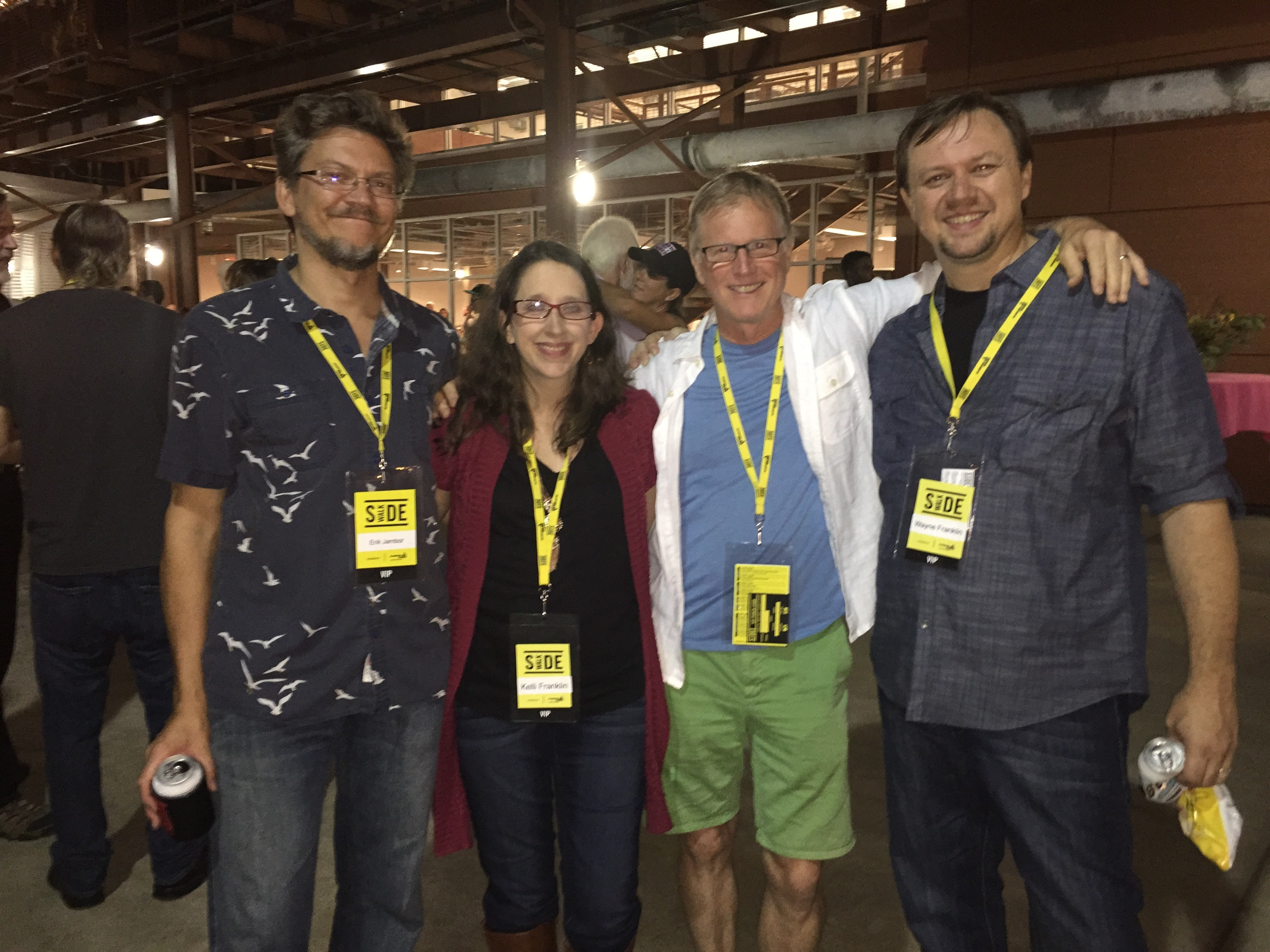
The three festival founders pose with original board president Alan Hunter at a 2015 Sidewalk Film Festival party held at Sloss Furnaces. From left to right: Erik Jambor, Kelli McCall Franklin, Alan Hunter, Wayne Franklin.

Sidewalk incorporated in 1999 as Alabama Moving Image Association with founders Kelli McCall Franklin, Wayne Franklin, and Erik Jambor; the festival debuted as Sidewalk Moving Picture Festival in the Theatre District of Birmingham, Alabama. Taking place during the first weekend in May, the first festival venues included the Alabama Theatre, a repurposed bank building, an outdoor screen, and outdoor tents; about 4,000 people attended the weekend.

Sidewalk has had three executive directors since 1999. Erik Jambor, a co-founder of the festival, served as executive director from 1999 to 2006; during the 2007 festival season, Catherine Pfitzer was promoted from operations manager to executive director. Chloe Cook was hired as executive director in 2009.

Over time, Sidewalk has accumulated many programs that run throughout the year. Their education and outreach efforts include a youth board, which creates a short film and judges other teen-made movies submitted to the festival; a Screentalks program, which involves the screening of an independent film and a panel discussion; and the monthly Salon, where local filmmakers give panel discussions or lectures on their craft.

In 2006, SHOUT LGBTQ Film Festival was founded by Jeremy Erdreich, David R. Garrett, Catherine Pfitzer, and Larry Slater. In 2010, Sidewalk officially changed its name to Sidewalk Film Festival, and Sidewalk and SHOUT merged festival weekends.

Sidewalk first garnered critical praise outside of Alabama when TIME Magazine listed the festival in its article "Top 10 Film Festivals for the Rest of Us."

In 2017, Sidewalk Film Festival Executive Director Chloe Cook announced plans to open a permanent independent cinema in Birmingham, in the basement of the restored Pizitz Building. In August 2019, Sidewalk opened the Sidewalk Film Center + Cinema in the Pizitz Building. The cinema includes two 90-seat theaters and a classroom.

In 2023, Sidewalk kicked off their 25th annual film festival.

== Awards ==
Films are given awards both by jury and audience choice. Over the years, some categories have been added or eliminated and sponsors have varied. There are also several special awards given annually, such as the Alan Hunter Best Alabama Film Award, the Clint Howard Character Actor Award, and the Kathryn Tucker Windham Storyteller Award.
