= Berlin Commercial Festival =

Berlin festival for visual media founded in 2012

The Berlin Commercial Festival The Berlin Commercial Festival for Creators of Visual Culture
- Nickname: The Berlin Commercial Awards
- Status: Active
- Genre: Commercials, Music Videos, Independent Film
- Frequency: Annually
- Venue: St. Elisabeth, Berlin
- Location: Berlin
- Country: Germany
- Years active: 13
- Founder: Phillip Ulita
- Previous event: 2024 Berlin Commercial Festival
- Next event: 2025 Berlin Commercial Festival
- Area: Global
- Sponsors: European Union
- Website: https://www.berlincommercial.com

The Berlin Commercial Festival is an annual international event that recognizes achievements in visual culture, primarily focusing on commercial work, music videos, and independent film projects. The Berlin Commercial Festival was founded in 2012 under its former name, The Berlin Fashion Film Festival. The festival's founder is Philipp Ulita.

The festival recognizes achievements across three mediums: Commercial Work, Music Videos, and Personal Work. Within each main medium, the festival includes a variety of craft categories such as Casting, Cinematography, Color Grading, Costume Styling, Direction, Editing, Idea, Production Design, Use of Sound & Music, and VFX/Animation. The festival also presents a Cultural Impact award, which recognizes works that raise public awareness or promote social causes like gender equality, racial equality, or peace.

The festival winners are selected by a panel of industry professionals. The selection process involves multiple qualification rounds: Raw Selection, Official Selection, Shortlist, and the final announcement of Winners.
