= Australian Effects & Animation Festival =

Annual festival and awards ceremony

The Australian Effects & Animation Festival (AEAF) is an annual international festival of visual effects (VFX), animation games and immersive media. The event, which includes an awards ceremony known as the AEAF Awards, a program of speakers, and technology showcase, is streamed live. The inaugural event was in 2000.

== Awards ==
The AEAF Awards are given in a ceremony held in Sydney, New South Wales. There is no charge for entry to the competition. As of 2022, gold, silver and bronze awards are given in the following categories:

- Commercials, animation
- Commercials, VFX
- Feature films, animation
- Feature Films, VFX
- Web Viral
- Titles & Openers for TV and Feature Film
- Idents
- Short film
- TV series and TV series children
- Music video
- TV student
- Games cinematics
- Education & infographics
- Live event
- Augmented reality
- VR360
- VR Experience

Special Merit Awards may be given "to works of outstanding merit that push the boundaries of visual artistry and introduce new techniques".

=== 2019 ===
In 2019, the awards ceremony was held at the Chauvel Cinema in Paddington.

=== 2021 ===
Winners included:

- Godzilla vs. Kong, Weta Digital, Gold, for Feature Film – VFX
- Jingle Jangle: A Christmas Journey, Framestore, Gold, for Feature Film – Sequence
- His Dark Materials Series 2, Framestore Gold, for TV Series
