= Cresta International Advertising Awards =

Cresta Awards
- Awarded for: creative excellence in international advertising, digital design and marketing communications
- Country: Worldwide
- First award: 1993
- Website: www.cresta-awards.com

The Cresta Awards are worldwide awards whose purpose is to acknowledge high standards of creative achievement in the international advertising, digital design and marketing communications industry and the creative disciplines that support it. The award decisions are made through an alternative judging process based upon narrow criteria.

== History ==
The awards, launched in 1993 by Creative Standards International Inc. in partnership with the International Advertising Association, were spearheaded by Nancy Ross, who had formerly helped to run the Clio Awards for 16 years. Cresta, which stands for "Creative Standards", has grown extensively with the evolution of digital media. In its 2019 competition it included: moving image, digital, print advertising, billboards/posters, ambient & experiential, integrated, radio, podcasts, branded entertainment, direct marketing, design, social media, creative crafts and technology.

In 2026, Cresta added a Finance category and expanded its Creative Use of AI category to include additional forms of AI-related work.

Cresta's headquarters were located in New York City from 1993 until 2018. In November 2018 the headquarters moved to London, when the Awards were acquired by Creative Standards International Ltd, a company led by Lewis Blackwell as CEO and Alan Page as President, both with backgrounds as creative directors. In January 2019 the Awards were relaunched, with a revised website and new commitments to community and educational initiatives.

== Judging ==
Cresta is an extensive and highly selective awards program. An official 2017 press release noted that more than 3,300 entries, from 53 countries, had been received for the 2016 competition, with 74 entries from 13 countries designated as winners. In 2025, Cresta gave 167 awards across its competition categories. Entries are judged by a Grand Jury of more than 120 seasoned creative directors, graphic artists, design and film specialists, from around the world. Members judge the shortlisted entries in their own time and individually, with a no-discussion policy placing the stress on creativity alone. This body decides on the Gold, Silver and Bronze winners, as well as whether an entry has met the pre-determined standard of earning a Grand Prix award, which is based on two elements: originality of the idea and the quality of the idea's execution.

Cresta also presents a Jury Chair Award, selected by the annual jury chair. Previous jury chairs have included Helen Pak, Yasu Sasaki and Merlee Jayme.

In 2010, Cresta introduced the Network of the Year and Agency of the Year honors, awarded to those whose entries achieve the highest scores, based on a points breakdown at all levels of competition. For the three years 2016-18, the overall Network of the Year was McCann. BBDO Worldwide and Serviceplan have been pre-eminent in the years 2022-26.

== Awards ==
For its first 12 years, Cresta held an annual awards ceremony in cities throughout the world, including Budapest, Milan, and New York. After the 2004 awards, it was determined that future winners would be announced via an online ceremony, allowing exponentially more participants the chance to view the winners. Following a relaunch in January 2019, Cresta committed to creating educational and inspirational events around the world, to further the discussion of creative standards and of the award winners. It also announced the launch of an international review periodical, dedicated to exploring creative standards.

The Cresta statuette is a crystal "S" shape with an embedded metal "C" component, which together are intended to embody the "Creative Standards" namesake. The "C" component is color-coded in order to reflect the four levels of winners: Grand Prix, Gold, Silver and Bronze.

In 2019, Cresta introduced a new trophy designed by Fernando Gutierrez and made in London by craftsmen. The redesigned award replaced the crystal statuette with a rectangular form combining an anodised aluminium upper section and sustainable wood base.

Entries submitted must be "broadcast, published or released in a commercial environment with client approval", according to a specific time frame, and accompanied by the respective single or campaign entry fees.
