= New York Festivals =

New York Festivals are a collection of related annual arts and media awards based in New York City. The awards include the New York Festivals Advertising Awards, "Advertising and Marketing Effectiveness" AME Awards, Bowery Awards, Global Awards, Radio Awards, TV & Film Awards and MIDAS Awards. They were established in 1957.
