= Epica Awards =

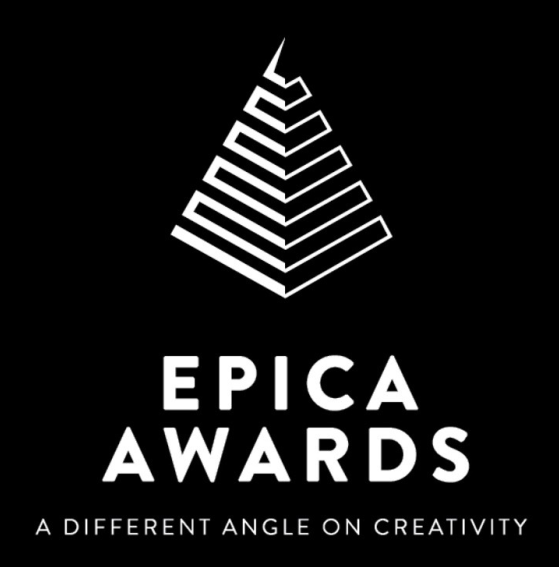
- Epica Awards Logo introduced in 2011
- Industry: Advertising
- Founded: 1987
- Founder: Andrew Rawlins
- Headquarters: Paris, France
- Website: www.epica-awards.com

The Epica Awards are an annual series of communication awards, created in 1987 and based in Paris, France. Having originally focused on the Europe, Middle East and Africa region exclusively, the awards became global in 2012. 585 agencies in total submitted to work to the Epica Awards in 2015, representing 75 countries.

Epica's aim is to reward outstanding creativity and help communication agencies, film production companies, media consultancies, photographers and design studios to develop their reputations beyond their national borders. The awards are judged during the third week of November by journalists representing the trade press. This jury aims to achieve objectivity and widespread coverage of the results. The best work is also published in the annual Epica Book and shown in the Epica on Tour showcase.

== Awards ==
The awards encompass all main communication disciplines: TV, Press, Outdoor, Digital, Mobile, Social, Radio, Promotions, Direct & Experiential Marketing, Media, Business-to-business, Public relations, Branded Entertainment, Design, Packaging, Integrated Campaigns, Film Craft, Photography and Print Craft. Complete results of the annual awards are announced in the press and confirmed on the Epica website during the last week of November every year. Category winners (gold, silver and bronze) receive an Epica crystal pyramid. Gold, silver and bronze winners also receive certificates.

The Epica Awards are open to all communication agencies, film production companies, media consultancies, digital agencies, PR specialists, photographers and design studios worldwide. Only work that has been approved by clients and used, published or broadcast since 1 July of the previous year is eligible to enter.

=== Jury and judging criteria ===
The Epica jury consists of senior writers and reporters from newspapers and online news portals around the world. Each jury member is selected based on certain criteria. The jury includes representatives from 290 renowned publications such as Forbes, Entrepreneur, National Geographic, The Australian, Vogue, GCC Business News, Ad Week, People, Arab News, Indian Express and Business Insider. The Epica Awards are the only industry awards to be judged solely by journalists.

Epica entries are judged on the basis of two criteria only: the originality of the creative idea and the quality of its execution (except in the Craft & Imagery categories where only quality of execution is taken into consideration).

The Epica results are determined by category. The highest scoring entry in each category wins gold, on condition that the work surpasses a minimum score that qualifies it as a category winner. Other entries in each category that achieve this score win silver or bronze. When no entry meets the standard there are no winners in the category. Four Grand Prix are awarded to the best overall film, press, outdoor and digital entries. These are selected from all the category winners. The agency and network with the most awards are given the Agency of the Year and Network of the Year trophies.

=== Epica Book and Epica on Tour ===
All the winners and a selection of other high-scoring entries are published in the annual Epica Book, which they receive a free copy of. The book showcases more than 800 TV commercials, posters, press ads, radio spots, PR projects, promotions, internet sites, graphic design projects, integrated campaigns, direct marketing, branded content and innovative media entries honoured in the previous year's awards.

Film winners are also compiled and shown in the Epica on Tour showcase. In 2016, the showcase toured Sydney, London, Paris, Stockholm, Moscow, Copenhagen, Minsk, Milan, Kyiv and New York City.

== Ceremony and conference ==
The Epica ceremony is held in a different capital city each year, on the Thursday of the third week in November. Cities that have hosted the ceremony include Berlin, Brussels, Amsterdam, Moscow, London, Zurich, Düsseldorf, Warsaw, Lisbon, Helsinki, Prague, Milan, Dublin, Budapest, Istanbul, Stockholm, Athens, Belgrade, Zagreb, Ljubljana and New Delhi. The ceremony is part of Epica's Creative Circle conference for industry experts, organized around a theme such as "The New Scope of Creativity".

== Past results ==
In the 2015 Epica Awards there were Grand Prix winners from Japan, the Netherlands, the United Kingdom and Austria. The UK topped the country rankings, obtaining 52 awards, including a Grand Prix and 16 golds. 585 agencies in total submitted to work to the Epica Awards in 2015, representing 75 countries.

- DIGITAL GRAND PRIX: "Taste the Translation" by J. Walter Thompson Amsterdam for ElaN
- FILM GRAND PRIX: "High School Girl?" by Watts of Tokyo for Shiseido
- PRESS GRAND PRIX: The "John Lewis Southampton" campaign by AdamandeveDDB, UK
- OUTDOOR GRAND PRIX: "Mini Traffic Lights" by Demner, Merlicek & Bergman, Austria, for Mini
- AGENCY OF THE YEAR: AdamandeveDDB won for the second consecutive year, with 14 awards including a Grand Prix and 4 golds.
- NETWORK OF THE YEAR: BBDO won with 43 awards, 11 of which were golds
