= Carlon Colker =

American physician and celebrity doctor

Carlon M. Colker
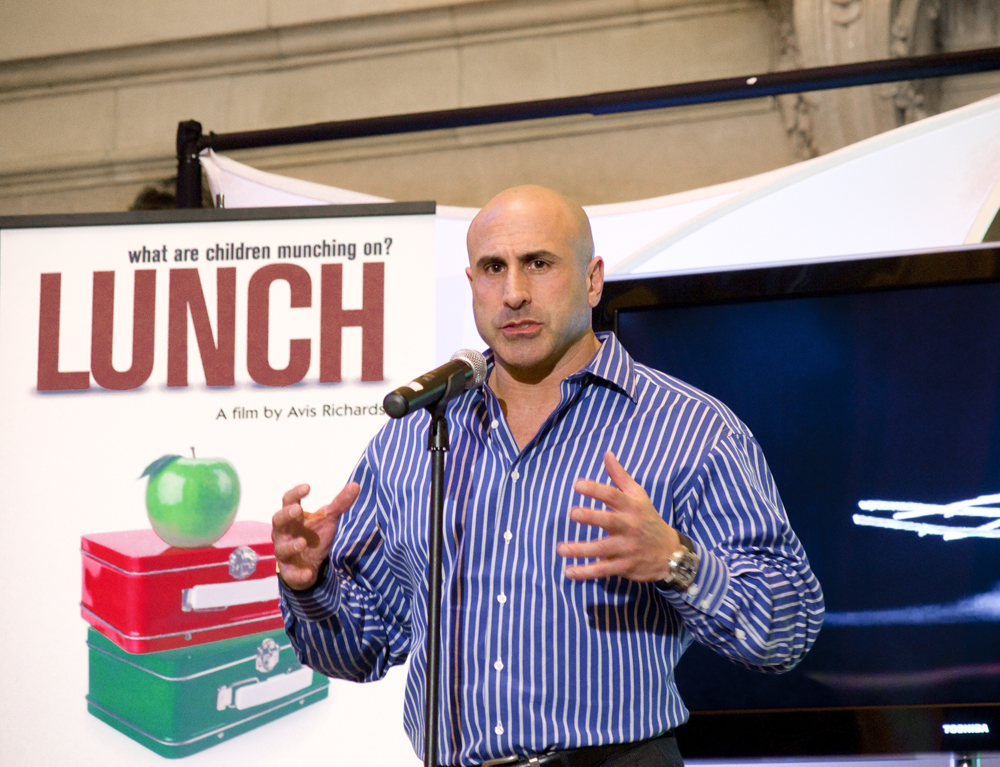
- Born: Carlon Morse Colker; June 21, 1965 (age 61); New York, New York, U.S.
- Education: Manhattanville College
- Occupations: Physician, author, journalist
- Years active: 1996 – present
- Spouse: Patricia Mary McRedmond (m. 2017)
- Children: 3
- Medical career
- Institutions: Peak Wellness; Weill Cornell Medical College; Yale New Haven Health; Greenwich Hospital; Mount Sinai Hospital
- Research: Wellness and longevity medicine, optimizing physical performance, applied kinetics, human nutrition, stem cell technologies

Carlon M. Colker (born June 21, 1965) is an American physician and celebrity doctor, whose practice specialties include internal medicine, integrative medicine, medical nutrition and applied nutritional science, sports medicine, human performance, injury rehabilitation, and longevity medicine. Colker is a former champion bodybuilder, powerlifter, and MMA fighter and coach. Colker has appeared as a medical correspondent on Fox News Channel's Fox & Friends. Colker has appeared on such shows as The View, The Today Show, ESPN Outside the Lines, NBC's Health Segment, Court TV, Bloomberg TV, and ABC's World News Tonight, offering medical advice.

Colker is also a contributing editor and columnist in the health and fitness press for such popular publications as Muscle and Fitness, Muscular Development, Flex, and Ironman magazines.

He is the founder of Peak Wellness, Inc., a private practice and consulting company in Greenwich, Connecticut, and was the chief medical officer and executive vice president for the dietary supplement company Atlas Therapeutics (doing business as MYOS Corp.).

Colker is an industry consultant and clinical researcher. As a published clinical researcher authoring a number of journal publications, Colker is also credited with numerous lay-press articles and books. He has served as board member, product developer, and/or spokesman for other companies including Microsoft, Hanes, Nielsen Corporation, Summit International (KK), American Media, GNC, Health Sciences (HESG—Chairman Scientific Advisory Board), LifeVantage, Atlas Therapeutics, ITV Ventures, Cytodyne Technologies, Muscletech Research and Development, Metabolife International Vital Basics, FairwayMarkets, R Baby Foundation.

In addition to his career as a physician, Colker is a supporter of, and active participant in, law enforcement.

== Early life ==
Colker was born to parents of Ukrainian Jewish descent. His father, Edward Colker, was a graduate of New York University, a lithographer, a maker of rare hand-bound books, and a Guggenheim Fellowship recipient. His mother, Elaine Galen, was a graduate of the University of Pennsylvania and an abstract painter.

Colker received his medical degree from Sackler School of Medicine at Tel Aviv University. He received residency training in internal medicine at Beth Israel Medical Center in Manhattan, New York.

== Career ==
In 1996, Colker was employed first at Park Avenue Medical Nutrition and then later that year, by Affiliated Physicians, both located in New York City. In January 1996 he established Peak Wellness, a company with locations in Greenwich, Connecticut and Beverly Hills, California that provides integrative medical services. Colker is an affiliate of Greenwich Hospital in Greenwich, Connecticut. and is an attending physician in the Department of Medicine at Mount Sinai Beth Israel Hospital in New York City. Colker also serves as a faculty member (clinical assistant professor of medicine in neurology) at Weill Cornell Medical College in New York City.

In 2000, American snowboarder Chris Klug received a liver transplant and with the assistance of Colker as his personal physician and performance training coach, in 2002 Klug became the world's first transplant recipient to compete in the Olympics, winning a bronze medal in parallel giant slalom.

May 20, 2003, Colker appeared on ESPN's "Outside the Lines” leading with a report on the death of teenager Sean Riggins from a heart attack caused by his use of ephedra, followed by a panel discussion with Colker and UNC Wilmington Health Coordinator Mike Perko.

In 2005 Colker published his first of three additions of the bodybuilding epitome Extreme Muscle Enhancement: Bodybuilding's Most Powerful Techniques, with 8-time Mr. Olympia Ronnie Coleman commenting that Colker's book is “…the first book that reveals the real mass building secrets of bodybuilding’s top pros. In fact many of the techniques in this masterpiece are the same ones that I've used to win 8 Mr. Olympia titles".

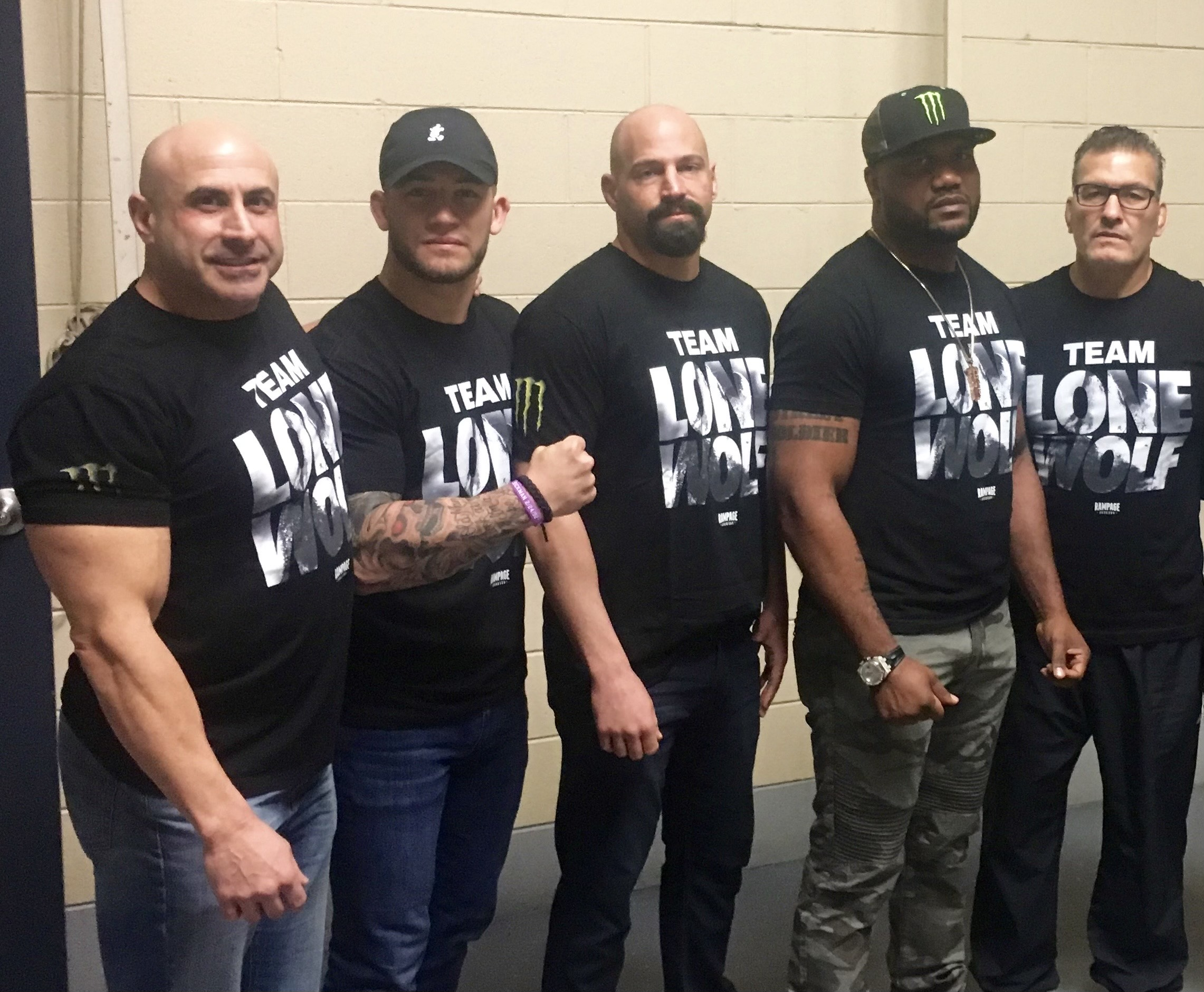
MMA Team Rampage

In 2006, Colker began training and coaching UFC light heavyweight champion Quinton "Rampage" Jackson. On December 27, 2008, for a key comeback at UFC 92, Jackson faced Wanderlei Silva who remains the only fighter to defeat Jackson twice, both in an impressive knockout fashion. UFC 92 would see Jackson avenge his losses, knocking out Silva with a vicious left hand.

Shaquille O'Neal and Doctor Carlon Colker

In 2007, NBA Hall of Famer Shaquille O'Neal has had a long and well publicized association with Colker stating "Carlon Colker, a guy I used to work out with. A guy that helped me win championships." In 2007 Colker, physician and trainer, appeared alongside Shaq on the ABC reality TV program Shaq's Big Challenge. The premise of the show was to use proper diet and exercise to turn around the unhealthy eating and lifestyle habits that led six school-age kids to morbid obesity. Shaq's long-time "personal physician and trainer", Colker served as the shows "medical advisor" for the series as set out "…to attack the ongoing obesity epidemic among children and help promote health and fitness over the gamut of American kids." Described as Shaq's "right hand guy", even into retirement, Shaq continues to work with Colker well into retirement, stating "Back with Carlon Colker, M.D. again, my personal physician and trainer of nearly 20 yrs!" As reported in the December 2007 issue of the Holtz Report, "medical advisor" for Shaq's Big Challenge, Colker gave his take on childhood obesity stating, "It's a problem. We've got to do something about it. It's systemic. It's epidemic. It's a disaster. And we've got to intervene. It's part of our school system, with the school lunches, as we showed. It's the fast-food businesses and those kinds of organizations coming in and sprinkling their fish food around the schools and trying to poison our children. That may sound harsh to say, but that's just what I believe. When there's cookies and soda and all sorts of stuff that's cheap and accessible to these kids, they're going to eat it. It doesn't have to be this way, but we have to hold everybody to task on this. There's no reason we shouldn't have physical education in every school system for every child."

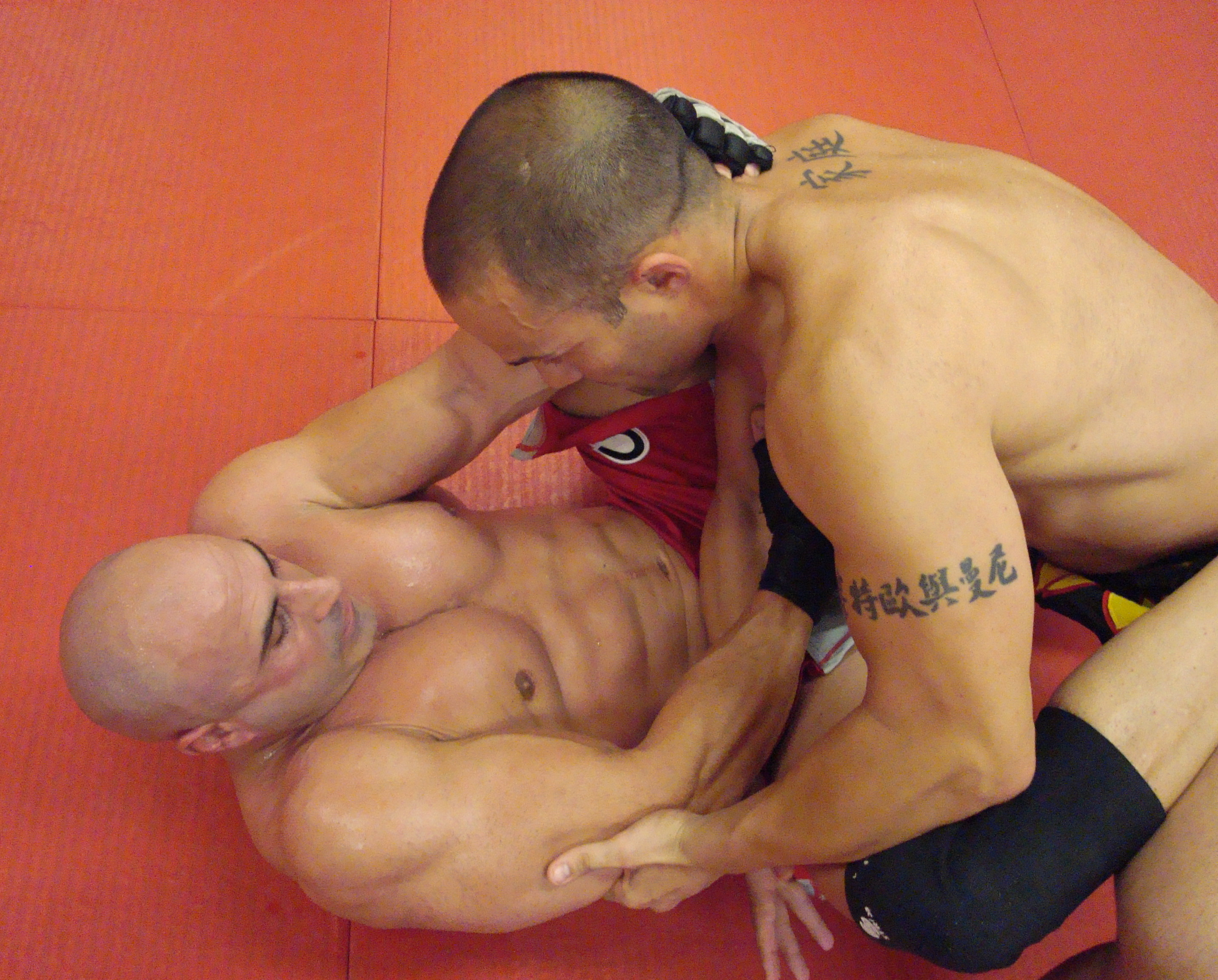
Carlon Colker MMA Training

Immersed in mixed martial arts (MMA) as both participant and coach Colker has helped a number of MMA stars excel. In 2008, former UFC light heavyweight champion Quinton "Rampage" Jackson enlisted Colker's help in his preparation for UFC 92. Colker was also the longtime personal physician, cornerman, and training partner for former UFC middleweight Champion Frank Shamrock, under which Colker is a Shamrock Instructor.

In May 2007, Sports Illustrated Senior Staff Writer Jon Werthheimm interviewed and quoted Colker as claiming that MMA athletes are "the best athletes in sports".

In 2008 preparation for UFC 83 Colker treated former 2x UFC welterweight champion Georges St-Pierre in preparation for his successful rematch against Matt Serra in which he reclaimed the championship. Since 2008, UFC fighter Mike Dolce has been training with Colker. Among other MMA fighters, Colker has trained are welterweight Neiman Gracie and heavyweight Daniel Gracie.

In May 2008, for the Children's Aid Society and Boys and Girls Club of America, "Former Supermodel and mother of three, Christie Brinkley, and celebrity physician Dr. Carlon Colker" were teamed up by Microsoft (makers of Xbox 360) as spokesmen "to promote healthy and active lifestyles for children and families". Colker and Brinkley hosted the inaugural National Family Fitness Day (a now annual event "designed to promote healthy and active lifestyles for children and families").

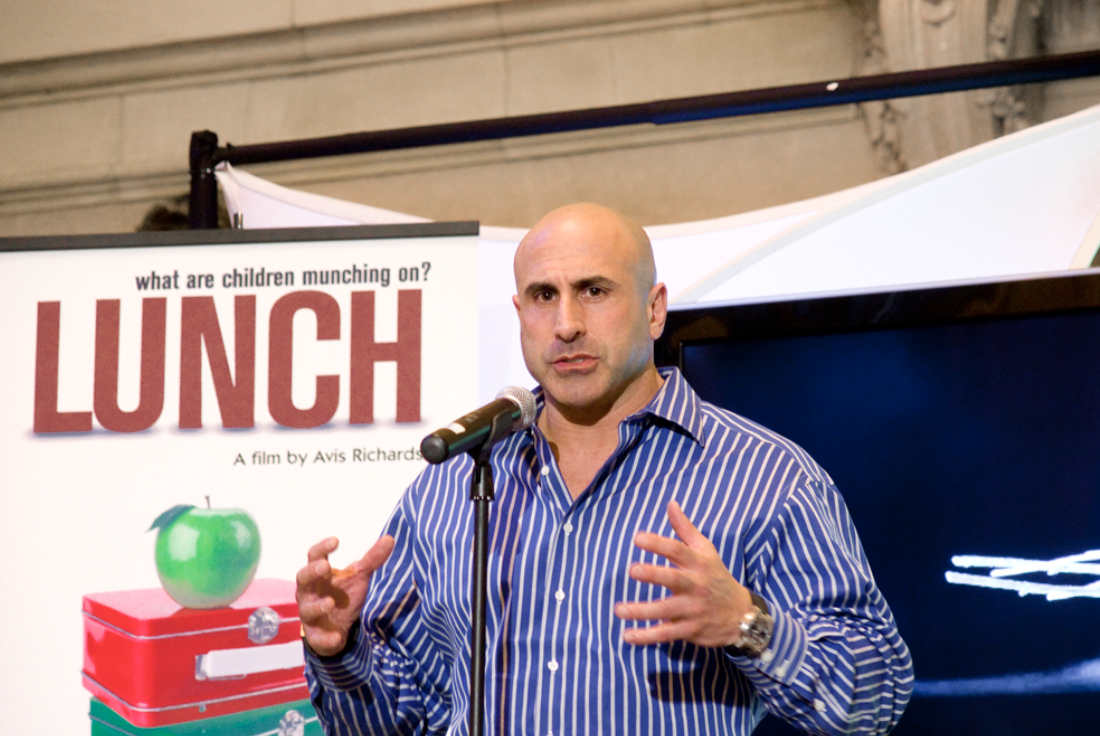
Carlon Colker lunch

In October 2010, Colker narrated the award-winning documentary Lunch, a film by Avis Richards, which explored the effects of the National School Lunch Program on America's children in schools in order to shed light on the current situation through candid interviews with doctors, teachers, farmers and various specialists.

In February 2011, Colker served as chief medical officer and executive vice president of Atlas Therapeutics Corp. (OTCBB: ATTH; formerly Marvin's Place, Inc.; dba MYOS Corp. as of May 2012; OTCBB:MYOS.

In June 2011 Wayne Gretzky, a proponent of Colker's MYO-T12 muscle building product, stated "I am hopeful that the product will help a lot of guys who are trying to find a natural and safe way to feel young and to stay active and fit despite their age ... including me". According to Consumer Reports, Gretzky said he takes Colker's product every morning. In June 2012, Colker resigned his position and became a member of the company's scientific advisory board. In 2008, it was announced that Colker would be serving on the advisory board of the multi-level marketing company LifeVantage. In 2005, Colker was named as head of the scientific advisory board of the dietary supplement company Health Sciences Group (OTCBB:HESG), and in 2006 the company announced that Colker would be assisting in the formulation of the supplement product Sequestrol. Colker was also a product developer and spokesperson for the dietary supplement Lipistat, marketed by ITV Ventures.

In December 2012, working with the Taylor Hooton Foundation to dissuade performance-enhancing drug abuse among school-age athletes, Colker publicly stated his position on the abuse of performance-enhancing drugs and how he is firmly against it. While underscoring the need in patients with medical necessity, Colker described in detail how he is against the abuse and misuse of these drugs.

In 2013, after more than a decade working with tennis legend, career grand slam and Olympic gold medalist Andre Agassi, Colker reunited with Agassi to promote Agassi's BILT line of exercise equipment, stating about Colker "You've seen it from the beginning you've been there in the trenches when I was out there on the court".

In 2014, Bradley Cooper enlisted the help of Colker for his iconic transformation into Chris Kyle for his role in American Sniper. Cooper stated "The transformation had to be completed quickly, in about three months' time, before filming began. "It was a heavily regulated regimen," Cooper told the Navy Times. "I had a goal of 30 pounds of muscle. Not bodybuilding, but to be like Chris. He was a very big, thick, strong man."

In 2015, for his Avengers role as Ant-man, actor Paul Rudd enlisted the help of Colker for his nutrition. "He hired the famous nutritionist Carlon Colker to help him with the perfect diet. As we know, the nearly 50 years old actor did very well."

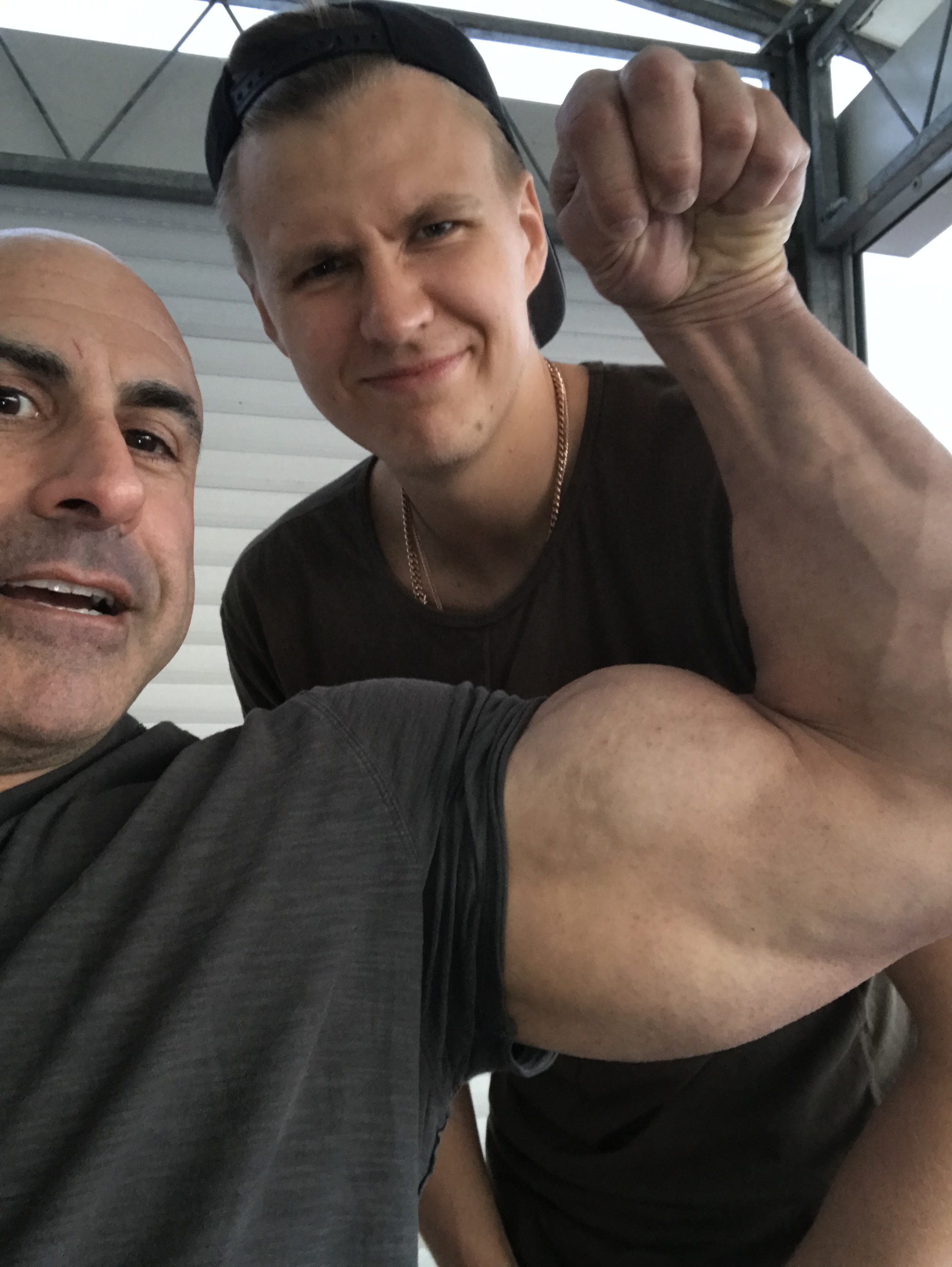
Dr. Colker with Kristaps Porzingis

In 2016 NBA All-Star Kristaps Porzingis began working with Colker during his rookie campaign when his older brother and agent, Janis Porzingis, contacted Colker "in hopes of finding answers that weren't arriving elsewhere". Janis referred to Colker as "the craftsman". Porzingis was laboring through, among other ailments, a painful shoulder that forced him out of the final seven games. Colker became "the power forward's personal physician and trainer". In a New York Daily News article on December 20, 2017, Colker himself acknowledged his "controversial" methods "Colker says his strategy of using squats to build up strength in big men – which he also utilized with Shaquille O'Neal – is considered taboo in the industry." Colker himself was quoted as saying "My perspectives are unusual, my methods are novel, and my techniques are unique. That doesn't come without a price. When one lone beast raises his head to takestock of a situation, turns and goes a different direction, it draws the ire of the herd." It was into his rookie season that Kristaps gave himself over to Colker's methods, seeing the results first-hand. As Kristaps put it, "That's where I gained so much trust in him." Aftera year of working with Colker, Kristaps was named an NBA All-Star for the first time in his career.

On March 27, 2018, working with NBA star Kristaps Porzingis, Colker came to his defense against press criticisms after his serious knee injury, stating "Despite the talk, 'The sky is falling, he'll never be the same,' that's a bunch of horse s–t," Colker told the New York Post's Marc Berman. "He'll be better than ever. He's going to blow people away. If you're around people who know what they're doing, it's not the end of the world. It's the end of the world if you have the wrong people around you".

As Justin Bieber's long time physician, Bieber described Colker in a 2016 feature article in GQ Magazine, as "a genius," "a physician," and "a bodybuilder" and credited Colker with ridding him of his insomnia related to a possible addiction to Adderall by using natural sleep aids.

== Law enforcement ==
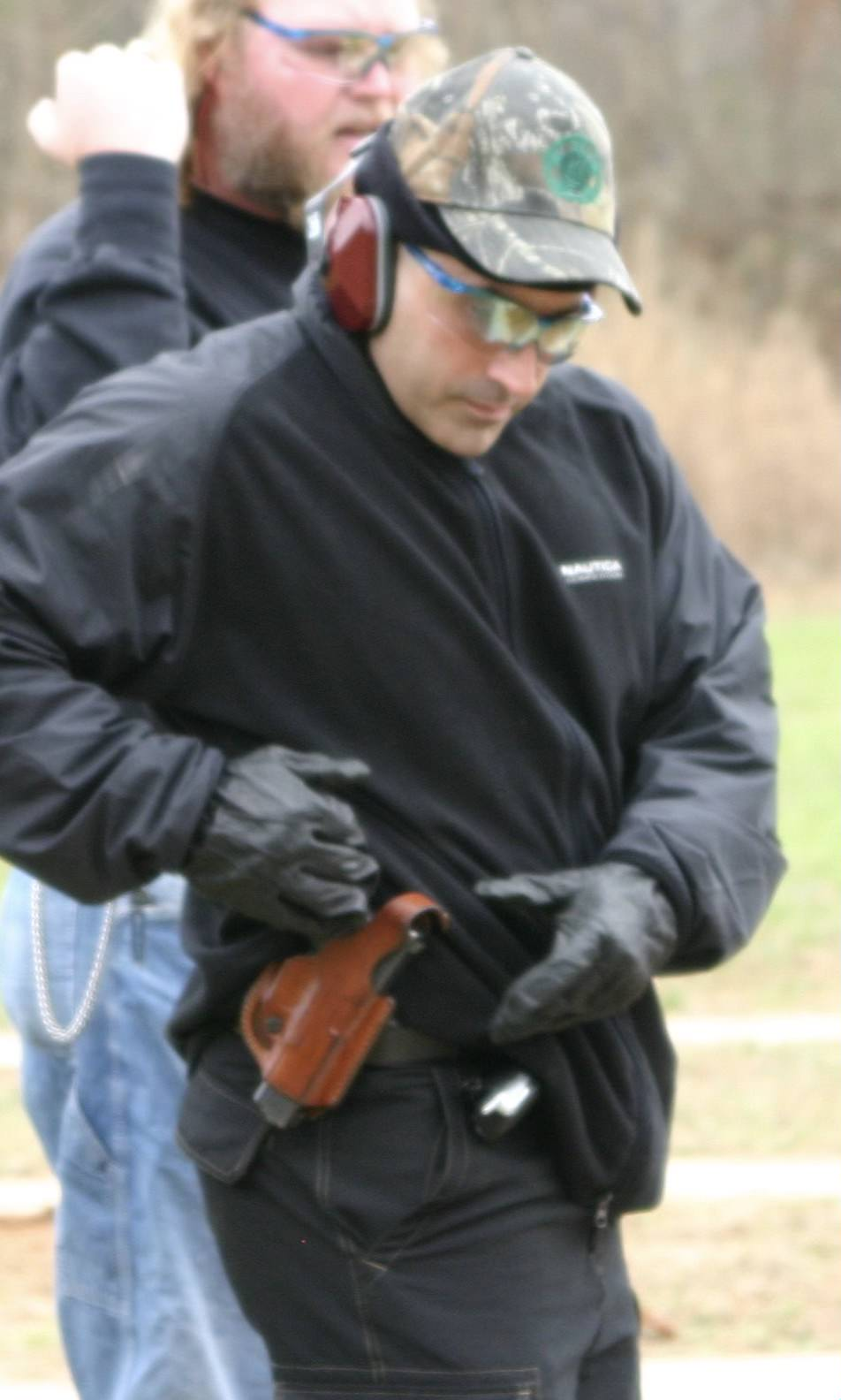

With a focus on protecting children from violent criminals, Colker actively served Bedford County Sheriff's Office Special Investigations Division in Bedford County Virginia working in the field as Task Force Sharpshooter and later as Deputy Lieutenant for Blue Ridge Thunder Internet Crimes Against Children. Colker served under the Department of Justice in the OJJDP law enforcement cyber unit ICAC Task Force Program preventing, interdicting, and investigating ICAC offenses.

After retiring from service, Colker continued to serve as Senior Advisor to the department. Retired from his work in the field, Colker continued his service to law enforcement to include Native Americans and indigenous people along with smaller underserved rural communities across America, in which Colker serves as on the advisory council of the Small and Rural Law Enforcement Foundation.

== Clinical research ==
Colker is a clinical researcher with a variety of scientific publications to his credit, though his published clinical research on ephedra as a natural weight-loss aide is the most widely referenced and thus received the most media attention and controversy. But Colker has published peer-reviewed studies on a number of other weight-loss substances including citrus aurantium, pyruvate, and guggulsterone. Colker has also published research in the field of steroids and human performance on steroids including "andro", "7-keto" and "nortestin". He is also published on a number of other subjects including research on a "milk-based bioactive micronutrient beverage on pain symptoms and activity of adults with osteoarthritis….. as well as studies on "whey protein" consumption for athletes and editorial expose on the controversies of using "soy". Colker's clinical research in human performance and exercise examined "the effects of full versus parallel squats"on muscle stimulation in athletes. His similar research also studied the effects of "deadlifts" on hamstring activation.

== Controversies ==
=== WWE and Vince McMahon ===
On January 25, 2024 the Wall Street Journal reported that Plaintiff Janel Grant, a former employee of WWE filed suit in Federal Court against the WWE and specifically their then Executive Chairman and majority owner, Vincent McMahon, for, among other accusations, that she was the victim of physical, emotional abuse, and sexual assault, as well as sex trafficking. Mr. McMahon responded that Ms. Grant’s accusations were replete with lies, obscene made-up instances that never occurred, and was a vindictive distortion of the truth. On July 16, 2024 in connection with her suit and in an attempt to further her case against WWE and Vince McMahon despite her case being stayed in Federal Court, Grant filed a pre-action discovery petition with the Superior Court of Connecticut against Colker and his clinic, Peak Wellness, Inc. McMahon, a patient of Colker, had referred Grant to Colker and his Peak Wellness clinic for complaints of fatigue. Grant’s claim against Colker was in part that she was provided vitamins and infusions of which the contents were intentionally undisclosed to her by Colker and his staff despite her supposed repeated attempts to inquire as to what she was being given. After her filing against Colker, global news sources ran with the story, publishing statements such as “Accuser Says WWE Doctor Paid To Give Her Mystery Drugs” On August 6, 2024, in response to Grant’s allegations, Colker filed suit against Grant claiming Grant had engaged in a smear campaign against Colker and the entire staff at Peak Wellness in order to bolster her well-publicized allegations concerning alleged sex trafficking and sexual assault by WWE, Vincent McMahon, and another, John Laurinaitis. As a direct result of Grant’s potentially damaging action, the press ran stories based on what was believed to be Grant’s false allegations. A spokesperson for the WWE stated publicly that “Ms. Grant’s petition for pre-action discovery against Dr. Colker is a direct violation of the court-ordered stay, and nothing more than an attempt to generate publicity on her false allegations and to harass people connected to Mr. McMahon, who is being sued by Ms. Grant in a separate matter.”

Based upon the statements already made and disseminated by Grant, the suit looked to seek claims against Grant for, among others, defamation, interference with business relations, and emotional distress, as well as libelous and wrongful actions.

In what was called a “blistering denial”, Colker defended his action and the actions of those at his clinic that Grant’s treatment was ever improper in any way. Colker’s suit demanded that Grant “…provide information concerning her activities in intentionally fostering patent lies and material misstatements…” concerning Colker and the staff at Peak Wellness. On May 2, 2025, Colker filed a federal defamation lawsuit in the United States District Court for the District of Connecticut against attorney Ann Callis and the Holland Law Firm, where Callis is a partner. The lawsuit alleges that Callis knowingly made defamatory statements about Colker and his clinic, Peak Wellness, both in legal filings and public statements. According to the complaint, Callis engaged in a “smear campaign,” portraying Colker as unethical and complicit in alleged misconduct by Vince McMahon. The lawsuit also identifies specific allegedly false statements made by Callis, including that he "forced" a patient to receive intravenous infusions of "unknown substances". Contradicting these public statements and the claims that the records were withheld, the complaint includes shipping manifests and an email from Callis’ legal team confirming their receipt. The suit seeks both compensatory and punitive damages, alleging that Callis’ statements were made with knowledge of their falsity thus actual malice. The lawsuit also asserts that the Holland Law Firm failed to properly supervise Callis and is therefore also liable.

Colker is represented by Alejandro Brito of Brito PLLC, an attorney known for his representation of President Donald J. Trump in multiple defamation matters. Brito previously secured a $16 million defamation settlement for President Trump against ABC News and George Stephanopoulos, following reports that Trump had been “found liable for rape” by a Manhattan jury in the E. Jean Carroll case. Brito also represents President Trump in a multi-billion-dollar defamation lawsuit against Rupert Murdoch and The Wall Street Journal over statements related to alleged communications with financier Jeffrey Epstein.

=== Ephedra ===
In the early 2000s, Colker was criticized for his research and commentary in relation to dietary supplements including ephedra-based products, amongst others.

Colker has generated controversy regarding his public comments and research on the safety of ephedra-based dietary supplements. Colker was the lead researcher responsible for studies and product development on behalf of supplement manufacturers such as Cytodyne Technologies, Muscletech Research and Development, and Metabolife International, manufacturers of the ephedra-based weight loss pills Xenadrine RFA-1, Hydroxycut, and Metabolife 365, respectively.

Following the February 2003 heat stroke-related death of Baltimore Orioles pitcher Steve Bechler, in which ephedra was implicated as the cause, Colker and two other physicians, all speaking on behalf of the industry-affiliated Ephedra Education Council, disputed the role that ephedra played in Bechler's death. Colker also downplayed the dangers of ephedra, claiming that it "is not a health risk for most people".

In May 2003, a California Superior Court judge handed down a $12.5 million judgment in a class action suit against Cytodyne Technologies for falsely advertising Xenadrine RFA-1, the product implicated in the death of Bechler. Colker had been enlisted by Cytodyne to conduct a clinical study on the effectiveness of Xenadrine RFA-1, and upon the study's completion, the company paid Colker to make conference appearances. Referring to Colker's research, the judge noted that Colker lacked credibility and concluded that Cytodyne had "not just exaggerated the findings of the clinical trials it commissioned, but had also cajoled some researchers into fudging results", and that those involved in the research on Xenadrine RFA-1 had set out "to create a study that justified the money being spent by Cytodyne and that would ensure that they received further work from the company". Journalists for The New York Times commenting on Cytodyne research noted that the legal case raised "serious questions about the way makers of ephedra and other dietary supplements use -- and often misuse -- the promise of scientific proof to market their products".

Looking at the very same facts of the case, but this time in Federal Court in front of United States District Judge Dale A. Kimball, Utah-based company Basic Research sued Cytodyne Technologies, Inc. for fraud primarily alleging Dr. Colker or Peak Wellness manipulated data and deliberately destroyed documents to "cover-up" their collusion to produce a favorable, albeit false, study in order to supposedly give Cytodyne the results it wanted. In sharp contrast to lower California state court ruling by Judge Ronald Styn, in Federal court, Judge Kimbal concluded that there was no evidence to support claims of collusion between anyone involved with the Peak Wellness study. At trial, every witness with personal knowledge of the study strongly disputed the ultimately false allegations. Kimbal found no evidence that there was any improper destruction of documents. Significantly, Basic Research offered no evidence that the protocol, methodology, design or implementation of the Peak Wellness Study was contrary to accepted standards for clinical trials. On the other hand, there was "ample evidence that the study itself was an adequate and well controlled clinical trial on humans, evaluated in an objective manner by persons qualified to do so", and that the study "used procedures generally accepted to yield reliable results". In the end, Judge Kimball concluded "there was nothing presented to the Court that supported such a finding or that even suggested that any of Basic Research's allegations were true" and that Dr. Colker and Peak Wellness were both "competent and reliable" in providing Cytodyne with "an adequate and well controlled clinical trial, conducted on human beings, evaluated in an objective manner by persons qualified to do so, and it used procedures generally accepted to yield accurate and reliable results". In the end, Judge Ronald Styn's lower court decision was appealed and completely vacated.

During 2003, Colker was named as a defendant in lawsuits filed in Missouri, West Virginia, and Illinois in connection with his involvement in the research and marketing of Hydroxycut and Xenadrine RFA-1. The lawsuits alleged that Colker and his Greenwich clinic, Peak Wellness Inc., ran fraudulent tests, altered test results, and hid dangerous adverse reactions suffered by test subjects. In July 2003, Colker was called to testify before a United States House Committee on Energy and Commerce investigating deaths and adverse events stemming from ephedra supplements for which Colker had been involved in researching and marketing. In August 2004 lawyers announced he had been dropped from the lawsuit and vindicated of all accusations.

=== V-Factor ===
Colker served as a researcher and television spokesperson for "V-Factor" (a combination of yohimbine, L-arginine, and Ginkgo biloba), a dietary supplement marketed by Vital Basics, Inc. of Portland, Maine as a men's sexual performance enhancer. In 2004, the U.S. Federal Trade Commission registered a complaint against Vital Basics and its owners alleging, in part, that the company's advertising of V-Factor violated Federal law; specifically, that the company made unsubstantiated claims about V-Factor's safety; falsely represented that a clinical study of V-Factor conducted by Colker proved that the product was safe and effective; and misrepresented paid commercial advertising featuring Colker (Vital Basics Health Show radio infomercials) as independent radio programs. The defendants settled the FTC's complaint by paying $1 million, which did not include Colker, for consumer redress and agreeing not to make unsubstantiated claims in the future.

=== Chinese herbals ===
In 2008, Colker made news headlines after advising actor Jeremy Piven to prematurely withdraw from David Mamet's Broadway play Speed-the-Plow due to concerns of alleged mercury poisoning from consuming excessive amounts of sushi and Chinese herbal supplement products. With Colker testifying in defense of Piven, Piven prevailed. As part of that decision on page 36 of the official transcript released by The New York Times, Arbitrator George Nicolau specifically stated the following regarding Colker: "Despite the Producer's attempt to attack the integrity of Dr. Colker, I have no doubt he was acting in good faith and that his opinion, not grounded solely on Piven's subjective reports of his condition but further supported by his own observations and examinations, was based on medical analysis unaffected by personal considerations."

=== MYO-X/MYO-T12 ===
In January 2015, Justin Bieber said he used MYO-X in preparation for a Calvin Klein underwear photo shoot and thanked Colker over social media; Bieber was criticized for "...hyping Colker's latest "miracle" supplement MYO-X, to his 59 million Twitter fans."

SEC documents filed by the manufacturer (MYOS Corp.; dba Atlas Therapeutics until May 2012), indicate that the product consists of a powder isolated from the yolk of fertilized chicken eggs. It was developed by Colker in 2005 as a supplement formulation that was marketed initially under the trade name Folstaxan by Celldyne Biopharma LLC and, subsequently, under the trade name MYO-T12 by Atlas/MYOS. As a "bodybuilder and physician who works with athletes" Colker is a cognized expert in the field of myostatin research as it pertains to sports. In an article in 2013 NPR interview, Colker expressed concern that myostatin inhibition will be abused by athletes in which their sport specifically bans these substances.

In February 2011, Colker sold the marketing rights and trademarks for MYO-T12 to MYOS for $1.15 million and entered into a three-year employment agreement to serve as the company's Chief Medical Officer and Executive vice-president, resigning in 2012 to serve as a scientific advisor for the company in exchange for 300,000 shares of common stock. In further exchange for the intellectual property asset pertaining to MYO-T12 including the formula, certain trademarks, trade secrets, patent applications and certain domain names, Colker's company, Peak Wellness, Inc., was also paid 7,024,000 shares of common stock. Under the terms of licensing agreements with MYOS, MYO-T12 is distributed by Maximum Human Performance (MHP) under the brand name MYO-X, and by Cenegenics (NASDAQ:CELG) under the brand name Cenegenics Muscle Formula (Fortetropin).

== Books ==
- Colker, Carlon M. (2005). Extreme muscle enhancement : bodybuilding's most powerful techniques (1st ed.). Manasquan, NJ: ProSource Publications. ISBN 978-0-9764593-0-9. OCLC 61116007.
- Vital Basics Exercise and Fitness. 2001.
- Vital Basics Cookbook. 2001.
- Colker, Carlon M. (2000). The Greenwich Diet. Hauppauge, NY: Advanced Research Press. ISBN 978-1-889462-10-3. OCLC 44127258.
- Colker, Carlon M. (1999). Sex Pills: From Androstenedione to Zinc, What Works and What Doesn't. Hauppauge, NY: Advanced Research Press. ISBN 978-1-889462-07-3. OCLC 317817262.

== Filmography ==
Year	Title	Role	Notes
2007	Shaq's Big Challenge	Himself	Reality TV show
2008	Bigger, Stronger, Faster*	Himself	Documentary
2010	Lunch	Himself	Documentary
2018	Porzingis' Comeback	Himself	TV documentary
