= Birds Nest Foundation =

Nonprofit visual media production company

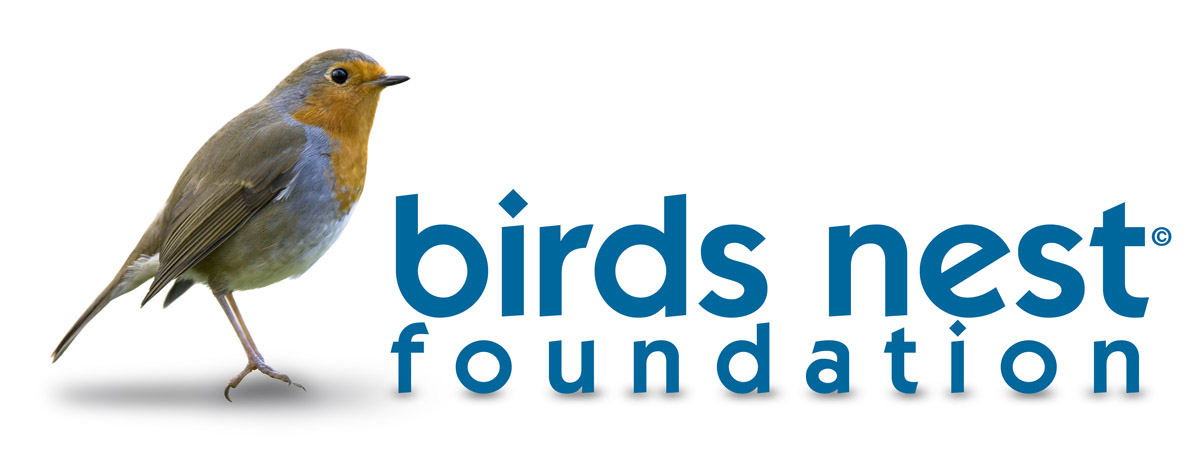
- Founded: 2005
- Founder: Avis Richards
- Type: Non-operating private foundation (IRS exemption status): 501(c)(3)
- Purpose: Education, Nutrition
- Location: New York City
- Method: Donations and Grants
- Key people: Avis Richards, CEO; Israel Bonequi, Creative Director
- Revenue: $280,268 (2015)
- Expenses: $471,962 (2015)
- Website: Official website

The Birds Nest Foundation is a nonprofit visual media production company that produces video content ranging from short public service announcements (PSAs) to full-length documentaries for under-represented charitable organizations. The foundation conducts its own campaign, targeting American youth to encourage and promote healthy eating habits. Based in New York City, the organization was founded by entrepreneur and philanthropist, Avis Richards in 2005.

== Organizational background ==
The Birds Nest Foundation was founded by Avis Richards in 2005, to provide high-quality media content to under-represented charities at little or no cost. The goal of the organization is to assist charitable non-governmental organizations (NGOs) publicize their efforts, without sacrificing charitable donations that could otherwise be spent towards their respective causes. Based in New York City, Birds Nest Foundation's funding relies on donations, grants, and sponsorship. In summer 2010, Birds Nest foundation became an official public charity under section 501(c)(3) of the US Internal Revenue Code.

Birds Nest Foundation works to educate students and adults about healthy lifestyles, proper diet, and the process of growing food. They serve as advocates to improve the nutritional value of school lunches. Their effort have produced a documentary film and two television shows, as well as an initiative to donate indoor garden sets to New York City public schools.

== Lunch Movement ==
The Birds Nest Foundation's Lunch Movement is a programming campaign that examines the deteriorating health of Americans, attributed to a poor diet. The campaign promotes healthy eating in public schools across the country, and highlights healthy dining options within New York City. The goal of the Lunch Movement is to reverse America's worsening health by educating students on proper diet, healthy habits and organic food growth. The program consists of Lunch: The Film, Lunch NYC, Dylan's Lunchbox, and the Ground Up campaign.

=== LUNCH: The Film ===
LUNCH is a 2010 documentary that exposes the unhealthy food being served in the public school system. The film highlights the efforts of individuals who promote nutrition and health by actively seeking alternative options. After screening at multiple film festivals across the United States, the documentary won several awards. The film holds distribution rights in Whole Foods Markets. The foundation is currently working on a sequel entitled LUNCH 2: The Solutions which will continue the discussion on malnutrition in the United States.

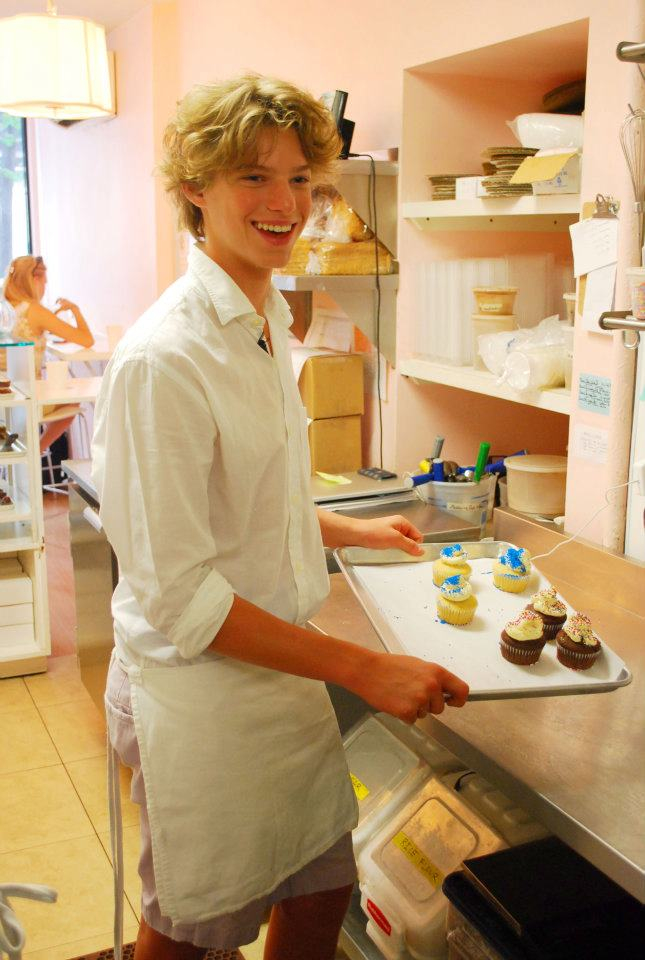
Dylan Richards hosts an episode of Dylan's Lunchbox in Tu-Lu's Bakery

=== Lunch NYC ===
After the successful launch of LUNCH, Richards produced a public television series entitled Lunch NYC for NYC Media, part of New York's Mayor's Office of Film, Theatre & Broadcasting. Lunch NYC is a weekly series that explores healthy restaurants and hotspots throughout New York City, educating New Yorkers about living a healthy lifestyle. The show piloted in fall 2010 on NYC Media's Channel 25 and featured 12 episodes. Lunch NYC was nominated for three New York Emmy Awards in February 2012, for categories in Community Service, Health/Science: Program Feature/Segment, and Graphics: News/Program.

=== Dylan's Lunchbox ===
Dylan's Lunchbox is a television show that discovers and introduces New York City's healthiest restaurants. Hosted by food critic, Dylan Richards, the show is inspired by the success of Lunch: The Film. Geared towards a young audience, the show demonstrates how to make healthier dining options. Originally a segment within Lunch NYC, Dylan's Lunchbox has expanded into its own show. Programming generally includes cooking segments by Dylan Richards, along with a chef, while they discuss the benefits of maintaining a healthy diet. The show has aired on NYC Media.

=== Ground-Up campaign ===
In Spring 2010, the Birds Nest Foundation launched it Ground-Up Campaign, an initiative to gift 100 New York City Public schools with indoor gardens. These Indoor Academic Gardens allow students to grow and enjoy harvests during the entire school year. Students learn about organic food growth and proper nutrition by working in the gardens developed by the United States of Food. The "Veggiecation" curriculum, created by Lisa Suriano, encourages children to eat their vegetables, by providing positive reinforcement through participation.

Research completed by the University of California Davis Center for Nutrition in Schools, demonstrates the payoff in this low cost/high return type of program: it improves knowledge of nutrition, food preferences, and consumption of fruits and vegetables, while integrating multiple subject areas and improving life skills, self-esteem and social skills.

== Awards and recognition ==
- 2006 Davey Awards – Non-Profit Video Production
- 2008 Aurora Awards – Platinum Best Of Show
- 2008 Davey Awards – Charitable/Not-for-Profit
- 2008 Davey Awards – Editing
- 2008 Davey Awards – Fundraising
- 2008 Davey Awards – Healthcare PCF
- 2008 Davey Awards – Public Service PCF
- 2010 Davey Awards – Editing for LUNCH: The Film
- 2010 Davey Awards – Education
- 2010 Davey Awards – Fundraising
- 2010 Davey Awards – Social Issues Documentary for LUNCH: The Film
- 2010 Poppy Jasper Film Festival – Best Social Commentary for LUNCH: The Film
- 2010 W3 Awards – Documentary Silver Award for LUNCH: The Film
- 2011 Davey Awards – Silver Award
- 2011 Empixx Awards – Gold Award for LUNCH: The Film
- 2011 Empixx Awards – Platinum Award for Lunch NYC (Episode: "Good Food Quickly")
- 2011 Stevie Awards – Video of the Year for LUNCH: The Film
- 2012 New York Emmy Award – Community Service (Nominated)
- 2012 New York Emmy Award – Health/Science: Program Feature/Segment (Nominated)
- 2012 New York Emmy Award – Graphics: News/Program (Nominated)
