= Avis Richards =

American philosopher

- Education: University of Maryland, College Park; George Washington University
- Occupation: CEO of the Birds Nest Foundation
- Known for: Philanthropy, Production, Entrepreneurship
- Spouse: Bruce Richards
- Children: Chloe Richards, Dylan Richards

Avis Richards is an American producer, director and philanthropist. In 2005, she founded the Birds Nest Foundation. Based in New York City, the 501(c)(3) organization works to provide other non-profit charities media content at little to no cost. In addition, Richards has produced and directed hundreds of episodes and films including Lunch: The Film, Lunch NYC and Dylan’s Lunchbox.

Lunch: The Film focuses on the nutritional value of school lunches in the United States, offering alternative options to traditional school lunches. The short documentary earned Richards recognition from the Davey Awards, Poppy Jasper Film Festival, W3 Awards, Empixx Awards, and Stevie Awards.

Lunch NYC, shown through NYC Media, focuses on the positive health movements taking place in New York City. The program was nominated for three New York Emmy Awards in 2012 in the categories of community service, health/science: program feature/segment, and graphics: news/program. Likewise, the show Dylan's Lunchbox, hosted by 16-year-old food critic Dylan Richards, features healthy restaurants throughout New York City and targets a young audience.

Richards launched the Ground Up Campaign, an initiative to donate indoor academic gardens to 100 public schools in New York City. The campaign partnered with Veggiecation Program, Grow to Learn NYC and Green Bronx Machine.

Richards has worked with Goldie Hawn, John Legend, Michael Bolton, Joe Torre, and Andre Agassi, among others.

Richards has received numerous honors including the 2012 Distinguished Alumni Award from the University of Maryland and the United Way of New York City Women Leadership Council's Luncheon Honoree. In 2010, Richards was honored with University of Maryland's Nonprofit Industry Impact Award and the Activist Award for Advocacy and Leadership.
