= Metamorphosis in the Slaughterhouse =

Iranian 2021 thriller-drama film

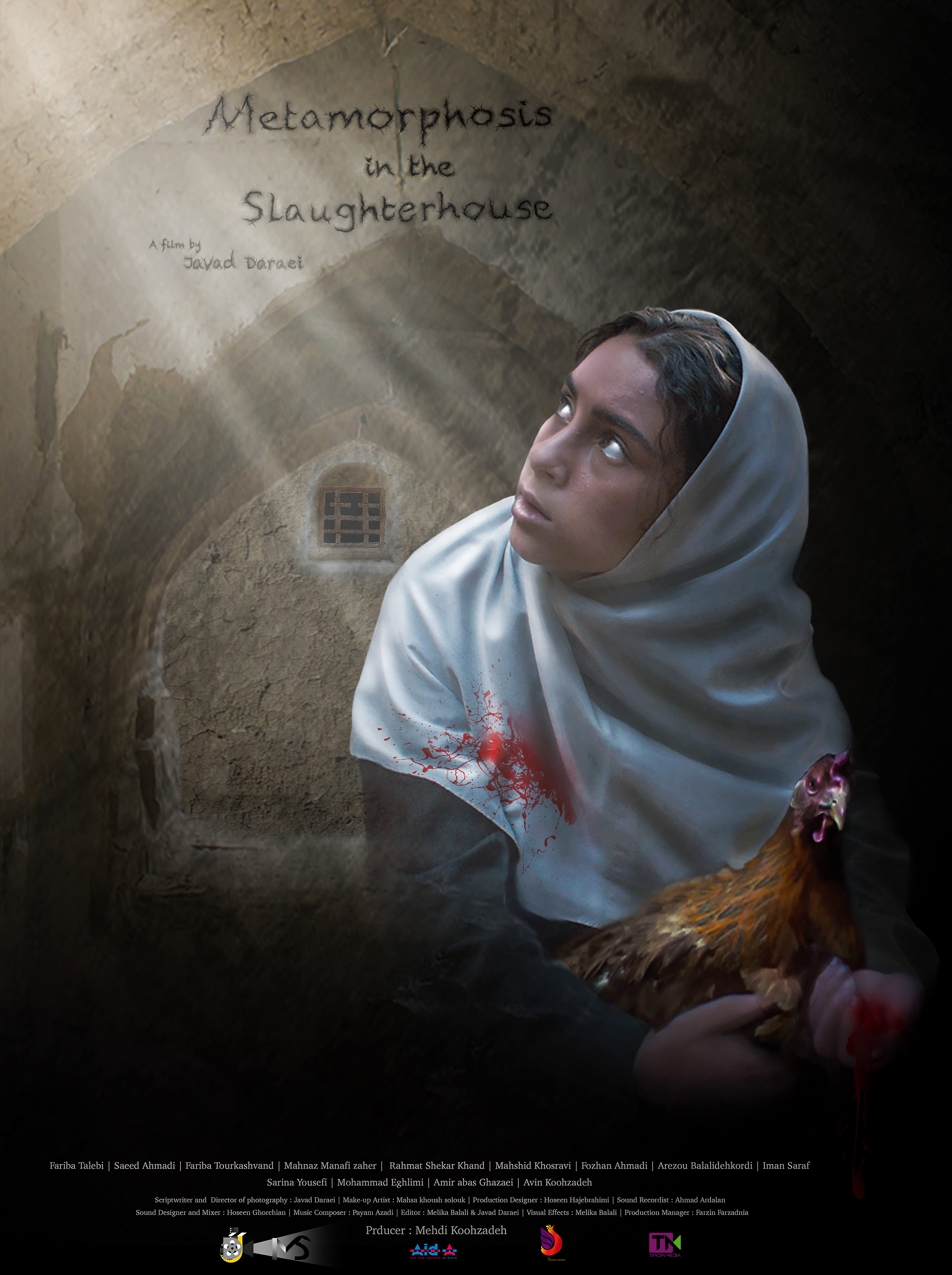
- The official poster of Metamorphosis in the Slaughterhouse
- Directed by: Javad Daraei
- Written by: Javad Daraei
- Produced by: Mehdi Koohzadeh
- Starring: Mahnaz Manafi Zaher; Sarina Yousefi; Saeed Ahmadi; Fariba Talebi; Fariba Turkashvand
- Cinematography: Javad Daraei
- Edited by: Javad Daraei
- Music by: Payam Azadi
- Release date: 2021
- Running time: 80 minutes
- Country: Iran
- Language: Persian

Metamorphosis in the Slaughterhouse (Persian: مسخ در مسلخ) is a 2021 Iranian thriller-drama film directed by Javad Daraei about of a girl named Shadi whose parents have been accused of murder. It won the Special Legacy Award and Bumblebee Award (AGAINST ALL ODDS) at the event in the Bare Bones film festival

== Cast ==
- Sarina Yousefi (as Shadi)
- Fariba Talebi (as Uncle's wife)
- Frahnaz Manafizaher (as Grandmother)
- Saeed Ahmadi (as Yari)
- Fariba Tourkashvand (as Teacher)

== Festivals and awards ==
Festival	Country	Part	Result	Resources
15th Cyprus International Film Festival	Cyprus	Golden Aphrodite	Nominee Best Editing	
15th Marbella Film Festival	Spain	Feature	Nominee	
74th Salerno Film Festival	Italy	Feature	Nominee	
14th Children's International Film Festival	Bangladesh	Feature	Nominee	
19th Riverside International Film Festival	United States	Feature	Nominee	
22nd Bare Bones International Film Festival	United States	Feature	Special Legacy Award and Bumblebee Award (AGAINST ALL ODDS	
kansas Film Festival	United States	Feature	Nominee	
Houston Asian American Pacific Islander Film Festival	United States	Feature	GRAND JURY AWARD FOR BEST NARRATIVE FEATURE	
Chelsea Film Festival	United States	Feature	BEST CINEMATOGRAPHY FEATURE	
Poppy Jasper Film Festival	United States	Feature	BEST FEATURE FILM	
Wales International Film Festival	United Kingdom	Feature	Nominee	
