= Lipman Hearne =

- Industry: Marketing
- Founded: 1988; 38 years ago
- Headquarters: Chicago
- Key people: Robert Moore (President); Minesh Parikh (CEO); Donna Van De Water(COO)
- Number of employees: 50+
- Website: Lipmanhearne.com

Lipman Hearne is a Chicago-based marketing and communications firm focused on the nonprofit sector. It traces its roots back to the founding of Lipman Design in 1966 and Hearne Communications in 1969.

In 1988, these two companies merged, creating Lipman Hearne, Inc.

Lipman Hearne is a member of the American Association of Advertising Agencies (AAAA) and has won a number of Higher Education Marketing Report Educational Advertising Awards, Telly Awards, Webby Awards, and Communicator Awards.

== Notable Work ==
The company has numerous conducted surveys about higher education that have been quoted in Inside Higher Ed ABC news and the Wall Street Journal.

In 2008, Lipman Hearne worked with the American Marketing Association to complete The State of Nonprofit Marketing: A Report on Priorities, Spending, Measurement and the Challenges Ahead. In this survey, Lipman Hearne and the AMA set out to provide the nonprofit industry with benchmark data on challenges, priorities, budgets, staffing, strategies, and spending to guide decision-making about marketing at nonprofit organizations.

In 2013, Lipman Hearne published The Super Investigator: Understanding Today's "Always On" Prospective Student. The survey, done in conjunction with college search site Cappex.com, took an in-depth look at 11,000 prospective college students to gain fresh insights into how students are consuming and responding to ever-changing college marketing channels.

== Partners ==
In March 2015, Four New Partners were revealed by Lipman Hearne. They are Peter Barber, Kirsten Fedderke, Alexia Koelling and Sara Stern.
