= Bundoo =

American parenting website

- Founder: Lewis Warshauer, MD
- Headquarters: Boca Raton, Florida
- Services: Articles on pregnancy, pediatrics, and parenting written or reviewed by qualified experts; an "ask-the-doctor" service, Ask Bundoo
- Website: https://www.bundoo.com

Bundoo is a parenting website that publishes articles on pregnancy, pediatrics, and parenting. It provides an ask-the-doctor service through Ask Bundoo.

Bundoo's target audience is expecting parents and parents. The site's beta version went live in summer 2013, followed by the full site roll-out in January 2014.

== History ==
Bundoo was created by Lewis Warshauer, MD, a retired radiologist. The company was headquartered in Boca Raton, Florida.

In 2015, Bundoo named Stephanie Winans CEO. Winans was previously COO and comes from a background in radio and media.

In November 2016, Bundoo was acquired by The Wellness Network.

== Publications ==
Bundoo publishes original articles, interviews, and videos on pregnancy and parenting issues. All the company's core content is reviewed or written by a doctor or qualified parenting professional. Bundoo also answers parenting and pregnancy questions directly through a Telehealth component.

== Awards and media ==
In 2015, Bundoo was named a honoree in the Webby Awards in the Parenting category. Bundoo was also named a Silver award winner in the 2014 W3 Awards for excellence in web design, sponsored by the Academy of Interactive & Visual Arts. Bundoo was featured in Marketing Sherpa for its successful use of third-party platforms to improve site metrics.

Articles featuring Bundoo experts or profiles of the site were published by the Huffington Post, Fox News, the New York Times, the South-Florida Sun Sentinel, Scholastic Parent & Child, and local television and radio stations in Canada and the United States.
