= Melika Balali =

Iranian-Scottish wrestler (born 1999)

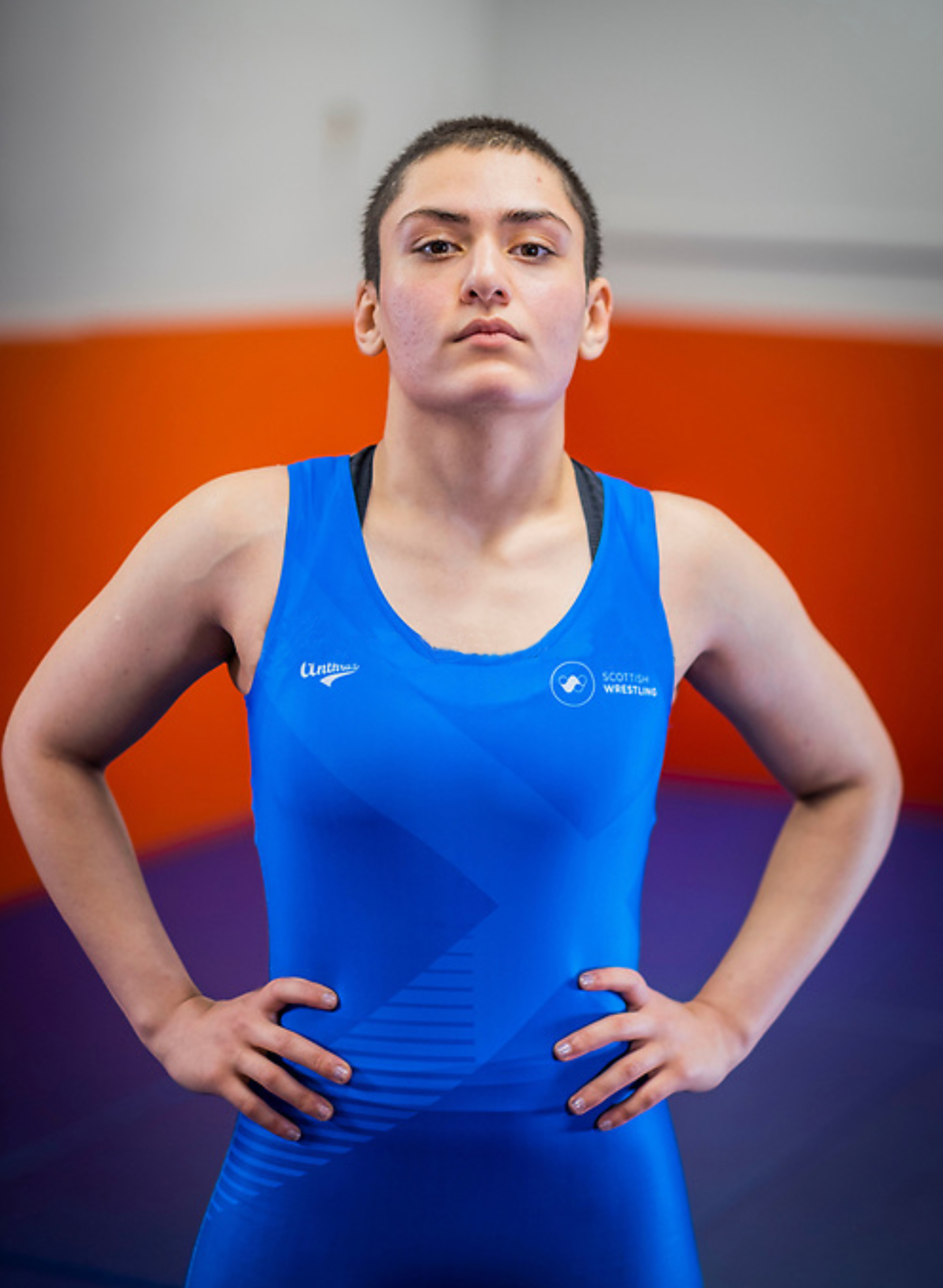
- Melika Balali, the reigning 2022 British Champion in freestyle wrestling, displaying her mastery in the sport

Personal information
- Native name: ملیکا بلالی
- Nationality: Iranian, Scottish
- Born: 27 December 1999 (age 26) Shahr-e Kord, Iran
- Weight: 63 kg (139 lb)
- Spouse: Javad Daraei

Sport
- Sport: Freestyle wrestling, Judo

Melika Balali (Persian:ملیکا بلالی; born 27 December 1999) is an Iranian-born Scottish judoka and wrestler, who won the British championship gold medals. Besides her wrestling career, she is a poet and painter who talks about women's rights in her work.

In July 2022, she became a British champion in freestyle wrestling and protested the compulsory hijab on the first platform, by raising a sign that read, "stop forcing hijab, I have the right to be a wrestler".

She later transitioned to judo after stating that United World Wrestling did not support her participation in international competitions. She currently competes as a judoka with the International Judo Federation (IJF) Refugee Team and is a recipient of the Olympic Refugee Scholarship.

== Biography ==
Melika Balali was born on 27 December 1999 in Shahr-e Kord in Chaharmahal and Bakhtiari Province, where she was also raised. In childhood, art and literature were her passion. She won the best poster design award at the Made in Arkansas Film Festival, for the short film "Limit" (2017) directed by Javad Dararei.

In 2019, she moved to the United States, and then later moved to Scotland where she started wrestling. She always loved freestyle wrestling but because of Islamic rules that govern Iran and force compulsory hijab any women don't have the right to do freestyle wrestling in Iran and they can't participate in International tournaments.

In her poems, she talks about poets and prisoners and women's rights; and illustrates women's suffering under gender discriminatory laws.

== Olympic qualification and United World Wrestling ==
Following her championship win, Balali sought to compete internationally and pursue Olympic qualification, including participation under the Refugee Team. In a 2024 interview with IranWire, she stated that despite engagement from the International Olympic Committee, United World Wrestling did not support her participation in Olympic qualification events, which prevented her from continuing her wrestling career at the Olympic level. IranWire reported that it contacted United World Wrestling to request clarification regarding her case but did not receive a response at the time of publication. In the same interview, Balali stated that she believed her public advocacy for Iranian women’s rights affected her chances of reaching the Olympic Games, saying that she felt she might have been able to compete at the Olympics had she not spoken out in defence of women in Iran.

== Judo, peace, and refugee identity ==
After being unable to continue competing internationally in wrestling, Balali transitioned to judo. She joined the International Judo Federation (IJF) Refugee Team and began competing as a judoka in international competitions. She is a recipient of the Olympic Refugee Scholarship, which supports refugee athletes in training and international competition. In interviews with the International Judo Federation, Balali has described herself as an ambassador for peace within the IJF Refugee Team. She has spoken about finding personal freedom, equality, and stability through judo after leaving Iran, contrasting her experiences in Scotland with the restrictions she faced under gender-discriminatory laws in Iran. She has also stated that judo played a significant role in overcoming depression and anxiety during her early years in exile and helped her rebuild social connection and confidence.

== Exhibition of ‘The Buds of Exile’ at Millerntor Gallery ==
The painting ‘The Buds of Exile’ was showcased at the Millerntor Gallery in Hamburg, Germany, alongside works by artists from various countries, from July 13 to 16, 2023. Inspired by the resilience of individuals facing exile, particularly Golshifteh Farahani, the piece symbolizes the strength and determination of Iranian women in challenging circumstances, aiming to inspire hope and contemplation among viewers.

== Death threats ==
Balali received death threats in June 2022 after protesting against the compulsory hijab, which resulted in Police Scotland implementing security measures for Balali after an investigation.
