= Gravel Road (film) =

2022 Australian documentary film

- Directed by: Tristan Pemberton & Tjuntjuntjara Community
- Written by: Tristan Pemberton; Harriet Clutterbuck ASE
- Produced by: Tristan Pemberton
- Starring: Jay Minning
- Cinematography: Tristan Pemberton
- Edited by: Harriet Clutterbuck ASE
- Music by: Desert Stars
- Production company: Flywire Films
- Release date: 2022
- Running time: 69–70 minutes
- Country: Australia
- Languages: English; Pitjantjatjara

Gravel Road is a 2022 Australian documentary film directed by Tristan Pemberton and Tjuntjuntjara Community. The film follows Australian musician and Spinifex man Jay Minning and his band, Desert Stars, the most remote rock band in the world, as they undertake their first tour across the Western desert.

The film was developed in collaboration with the Tjuntjuntjara Community and contributes to Australia's rich history of Outback culture. It explores Spinifex culture, through Jay's perspective, using a road film structure.

== Synopsis ==
The documentary centres on Jay Minning, frontman of the band Desert Stars, who are based in Tjuntjuntjara in the Great Victoria Desert. It follows the group's first tour across remote Australian communities, in support of their second studio album, Mungangka Ngaranyi (It's On Tonight).

The film documents performances on the road as well as daily life in a remote community. It depicts the practical challenges of travelling long distances in isolated regions, alongside the cultural role of music within the community.

Through the band's song 'Running', it also explores the historical impact of British nuclear testing at Maralinga and its ongoing effects on the local population.

== Production ==
Gravel Road was directed, filmed, and produced by Tristan Pemberton. The production was carried out in collaboration with the Tjuntjuntjara Community, whose members contributed to the film's development and approved the final version.

Filming took place in Tjuntjuntjara and surrounding areas of the Great Victoria Desert in Western Australia.

The tour was supported by East Coast band, The Re-mains, who mentored the band on the logistics of touring, in return for a cultural experience in Spinifex Country. The film was produced with a small crew, with Pemberton undertaking multiple roles including cinematography.

== Release ==
The film had its international premiere in 2022 at Phoenix Film Festival, Arizona, USA.

The Australian premiere was held later in 2022 at CinefestOZ, Margaret River.

It was also screened at other Australian and international festivals, including Poppy Jasper International Film Festival in the United States and St Kilda Film Festival, Australia.

The film later became available via streaming platforms including Beamafilm, ClickView and Amazon Prime.

== Reception ==
Gravel Road has received coverage in a number of film and media publications.

James Fletcher of FilmInk described the documentary as "a charming and engaging chronicle of the trials and tribulations" of The Desert Stars on tour and describes Pemberton's "camera the freedom to present some of the rawer aspects of Indigenous life, including the hunting and preparation of meals that reflect the First Nations traditional methods."

National Indigenous Times commented, "Through their music, which blends rock 'n' roll with Indigenous culture and language, they continue to break cultural barriers."

The film won the Best Documentary Feature award at the 2022 Poppy Jasper International Film Festival, USA, and Best Road Film at 2023 Sound on Screen Film Festival, South Africa.

== Analysis ==
Commentary on Gravel Road has noted its combination of road film structure and observational documentary techniques.

The film has been discussed in relation to Pemberton's collaborative filmmaking practices, with the involvement of the Tjuntjuntjara community shaping both its narrative and production approach.

Its focus on music has been interpreted by Ngaarda Media as "a testament to the power of music to transcend cultural boundaries and connect people from all walks of life. Their journey from remote roots to the national stage is a source of inspiration and pride, celebrating the rich heritage and contemporary vibrancy of Indigenous culture".

== See also ==
- Indigenous Australian music
- Cinema of Australia
- List of Australian documentary films
