= Bare Bones International Film Festival =

Film festival

Bare Bones International Film and Music Festival
- Location: Muskogee, Oklahoma, United States
- Founded: 1999
- Founded by: Darkwood Film Arts Institute
- Festival date: Late April (11 days)
- Website: barebonesfilmfestival.org

The Bare Bones International Film and Music Festival was founded in 1999 by the Darkwood Film Arts Institute in the city of Muskogee, Oklahoma, United States to showcase independent motion picture projects with budgets of less than 1 million dollars (hence "bare bones"). The festival runs for eleven days each year in late April at several venues in downtown Muskogee.

MovieMaker Magazine called Bare Bones a "small-town festival that celebrates indie auteurs, directors, screenwriters, actors and cinematographers in a big way." In 2010, MovieMaker named Bare Bones to its list of 25 Film Festivals Worth the Entry Fee.

== Awards ==
=== 2021 ===
- Best Foreign Language (subtitled): The Vanishing Hitchhiker by Rosario Brucato
- Best Domestic Violence Awareness: Honey Cycle by Yudelka Heyer
- Best Drama: Bone Cage by Taylor Olson
- Best of Fest Song Lyrics: "Special Someone" by Michael Lafata
- Best Original Song Lyrics and Music: "Black Hurts" by Terry Blade
- Shironbutterfly's Bumblebee Awards (Against All Odds): Metamorphosis in the Slaughterhouse by Javad Daraei and Leave A Message by David Malouf
- Special Legacy Festival Awards: Metamorphosis in the Slaughterhouse by Javad Daraei and Leave A Message by David Malouf
