= Marika Takeuchi =

Japanese composer and pianist (born 1987)

Marika Takeuchi 竹内まりか
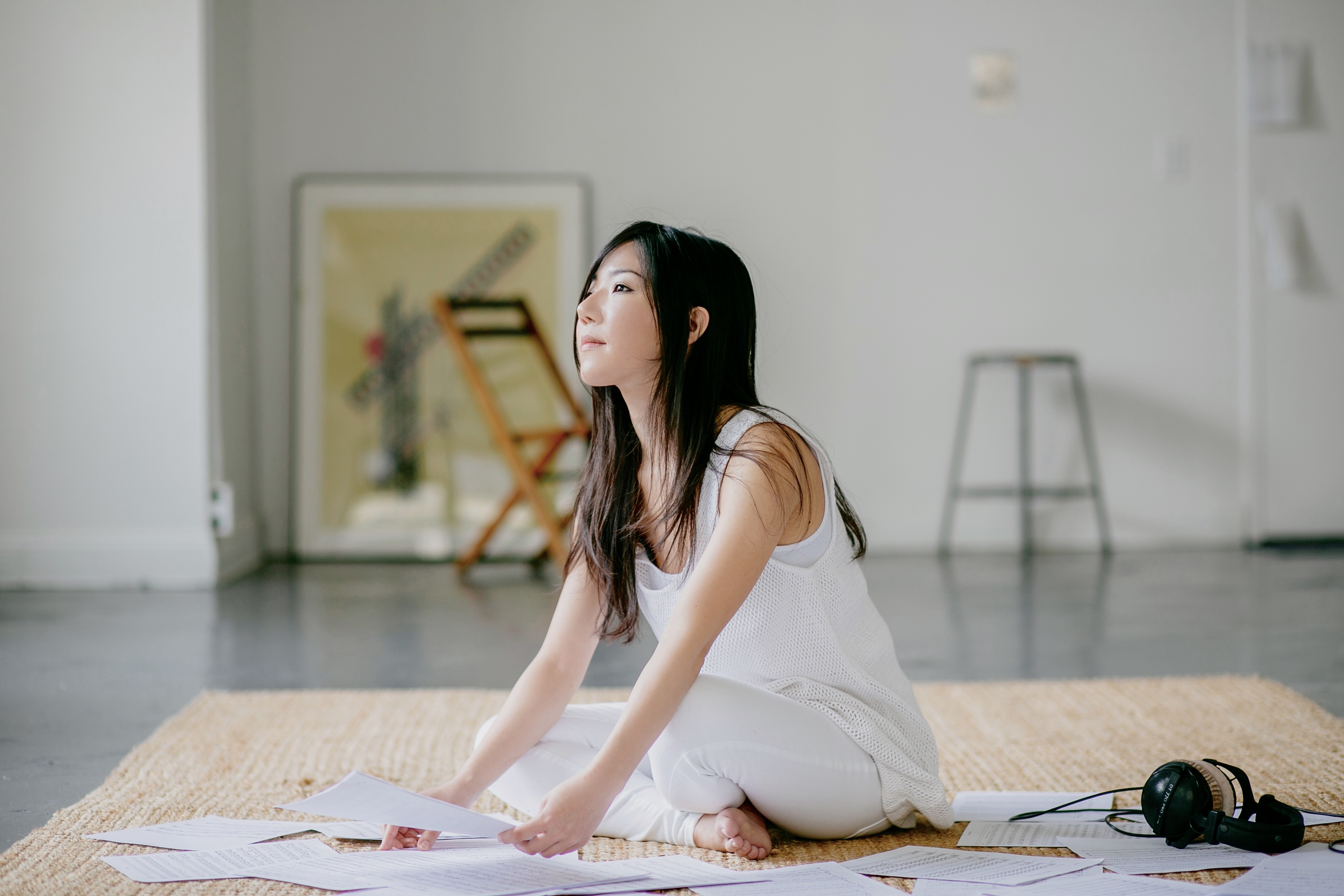

Background information
- Born: 14 March 1987 (age 39); Kawasaki, Japan
- Genres: Modern classical music, Film music, Ambient music
- Occupations: Composer, pianist, producer, orchestrator
- Instrument: Piano
- Years active: 2007–present
- Labels: MRG Recordings, Independent, Bigo & Twigetti
- Website: marika-takeuchi.com

Marika Takeuchi (born 14 March 1987 in Kawasaki) is a Japanese contemporary composer, film composer, music producer and pianist.

== Education ==
Takeuchi is a graduate of Berklee College of Music in Boston, and Shobi Music College in Tokyo.

== Biography ==
Takeuchi started her music studies as a classical pianist at the age of three, and also played violin and French horn for several years at an early age.

Her early career in Japan includes composing additional music for NHK FM's radio shows, and songwriting for Universal Music Japan's singer Nami Tamaki's album "STEP". Her second album Impressions was nominated for Best Neo-classical Album at the 10th Zone Music Reporter music awards, as well as Album of the Year in the 4th Annual Reviews New Age Awards. Her third album, Rain Stories, was released in 2014 on MRG Recordings. Her fourth album, Colors in the Diary, which is produced by Will Ackerman, and features Eugene Friesen and Boston Symphony Orchestra violinist Si-Jing Huang, was released in April 2016.

Takeuchi has also scored several films and advertisements. She wrote music for the Norwegian landscape photographer Terje Sørgjerd/TSO Photography's time-lapse video The Arctic Light. This composition was later released as a single, and has been featured in many short films and advertisements around the world, including a TV commercial for Curtin University in Australia, the Norwegian Tourist Board (Visit Norway), and others. She has scored several award-winning short films, including More Than One, directed by Takahisa Shiraishi. She is a supporter of marine life conservation, and has written music for Whale and Dolphin Conservation's DVD release A Whale of Time in the Gulf of Maine.

She released a single Found in June 2018, and another single Night Time, and an album Melding in July 2018 on a London-based label Bigo & Twigetti. She was also commissioned to write a piano solo piece Bloom for Sony Masterworks pianist Lara Downes' new album Holes in the Sky, which was released in March 2019. In addition to her releases as an artist, she writes music for music libraries, including West One Music Group and Fujipacific Music Inc, and her music has been featured in various TV shows. Her EP Daydream was released in November 2019, and her EP Missing Piece was released in May 2020. In July 2022, she released her latest album Lost Letters on West One Music Group.

== Personal life ==
Marika Takeuchi is in a relationship with American producer Michael A. Pruss. They had a daughter, Emily, in the summer of 2022. They got married in Japan in February 2023.

== Discography ==
=== Albums ===
- Impressions (2013, MRG Recordings)
- Rain Stories (2014, MRG Recordings)
- Colors in the Diary (2016, Marika Takeuchi)
- Melding (2018, Bigo & Twigetti)
- Lost Letters (2022, West One Music Group)

=== EPs ===
- Night Dream (2011, Marika Takeuchi)
- Daydream (2019, Bigo & Twigetti)
- Missing Piece (2020, Bigo & Twigetti)

=== Singles ===
- The Arctic Light (2011, Marika Takeuchi)
- Found (2018, Bigo & Twigetti)
- Night Time (2018, Bigo & Twigetti)
- Driven (2019, Bigo & Twigetti)
- Out Looking In (2020, Filter Label)
- The Pain That You Use (2021, Filter Label)

=== Compilation albums ===
- Holes in the Sky by Lara Downes, Track 17 Bloom (2019, Sony Masterworks)
- The Gathering IV by Various Artists, Track 6 Green Field (2019, West River Records)
- Scale by Various Artists, Track 15 Forgotten (2019, Bigo & Twigetti)
- The Hygge Collection Vol.1 by Various Artists, Track 5 Five for Silver (2020, Sonder House)
- Perceptions by Various Artists, Track 13 Unspoken Words (Bigo & Twigetti)
- 10 Waltzes by Various Artists, Track 6 Recovery (2021, Bigo & Twigetti)
- Perceptions Vol. 2 by Various Artists, Track 13 Breathe Out (2021, Bigo & Twihetti)
- The Shape of Piano To Come by Various Artists, Track 12 Distanced (2021, INRI Classic)
- For Ukraine by Various Artists, Track 18 Brighter Days (2022, Headphone Commute)
- Perceptions Vol. 3 by Various Artists, Track 8 Closer (2022, Bigo & Twigetti)

=== Soundtracks ===
- The Arctic Light (Short, 2011)
- The Shoe (Short, 2012)
- Finding Ambrosia (Short, 2012)
- Horizons: 50 Years (Short, 2013)
- Without You (Short, 2014)
- More Than One (Short, 2015)
- Link to a Dream Journey (TV series, 2017)
- The Vanishing Hitchhiker (film)

=== Music Libraries ===
- Post Classical 〜起・承・転・結〜 (2018, Fujipacific Music Inc)
- Post Classical 〜雪・月・風・花〜 (2019, Fujipacific Music Inc)
- Phenomenal Women Vol. 3 (2019, MPATH/APM)
- WABI-SABI Vol. 6 (2019, Fujipacific Music Inc)
- Savannahs (2020, Extreme Music)
- Emotive Classical Piano (2021, West One Music Group)
- Bright Horizons (2022, West One Music Group)
