= The Vanishing Hitchhiker (film) =

- Poster of film
- Directed by: Rosario Brucato
- Written by: Rosario Brucato
- Produced by: Rosario Brucato
- Starring: Giuseppe Brucato; Veronica Brucato; Emanuela De Rossi
- Cinematography: Rosario Brucato
- Edited by: Rosario Brucato
- Music by: Marika Takeuchi
- Production company: R.B. Cinema
- Distributed by: R.B. Cinema
- Release date: December 2020 (London)
- Running time: 16 minutes
- Countries: Italy, United States
- Language: Italian

The Vanishing Hitchhiker is a 2020 Italian horror-supernatural-drama short film, written, directed and edited by Rosario Brucato. Various themes intertwine in the film such as maternal love, kindness, the supernatural, premature death and the suspense that dominates in the film following the other themes. The film is loosely based on the famous urban legend of The Vanishing Hitchhiker.

== Plot ==
Franz meets a young and mysterious hitchhiker who says her car has broken down. Franz accompanies her home. The following day, he gets into his car and sees her necklace on the upholstery. He brings it back to her, but when he arrives at her house he comes across a terrifying discovery.

== Cast ==
- Veronica Brucato as Sharon
- Giuseppe Brucato as Franz
- Emanuela De Rossi as Sharon's mother

== Production ==
The film was shot in Italy and post-production was completed in Los Angeles and Saint Paul, Minnesota.

== Awards and nominations ==
The film has participated in various international festivals. In December 2020 it entered the competition at the Lift-Off Global Network in London and later in that of Berlin. It won at the Bare Bones International Film Festival for Best Foreign Language - Best of Fest and was screened live and online, It won the Remi Award at the 54th edition of the WorldFest-Houston International Film Festival. It was named Best of Fest and Best of Encores at the 40th Minneapolis–Saint Paul International Film Festival, It was nominated and screened live at the Fright Night Film Fest and the Route 66 Film Festival. It was also screened live in Colorado at the Dickens Horror Film Festival. It has won at other international festivals, mainly in the United States.
