= Route 66 Film Festival =

Annual film festival in Illinois

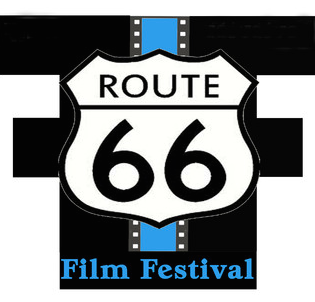
- Location: Springfield, IL, U.S.
- Founded: 2002
- Language: English
- Website: www.route66filmfestival.net

Route 66 Film Festival is an annual film festival that takes place the first weekend of November. The film festival is located in Springfield, IL and first began in November 2002.

== Background ==
The festival was initially created to celebrate the vehicles and history of the famous Route 66 highway. The film festival took place during Springfield's International Route 66 Mother Road Festival but separated itself from the road festival in order to be represented as an independent event.

The Festival mission and objective is to support and recognize independent filmmakers of all ages and backgrounds. The festival focuses on the idea of journey—emotional, physical, spiritual, and personal. The films represented at the festival highlight journeys from the American West as well as from around the world. The Route 66 Film festival has presented films from all around the world. International films that have been screened at the Route 66 Film Festival include country representations from Belgium, France, South Africa, Japan, Brazil, Spain, Great Britain, Uruguay, Mexico, Canada, and the United States. Diversity is celebrated and embraced and is represented in both feature films and short films.

== Festival Programmers and Staff ==
The following people provide programming and support.

Position	Name
Festival Director	Siobhan M Johnson
Board Member	Lana Wildman
Board Member	Crissie Trigger
Board Member	Christine Samoore
Director of Communications and Marketing	and Thea Chesley

== Film Categories ==
Feature films as well as short films are sorted into nine categories. The film categories include, Animation, Comedy, Drama, Experimental, Foreign Language, Debut Film, Student Showcase, Made in Illinois, as well as Heroes and Heroines. The Student Showcase screens short films that are no more than 30 minutes in length by students who are in their 4th year of college or younger. All films are independently backed or produced by the represented school or university. Made in Illinois screens films of all genres that are specifically filmed in Illinois. The films represent Illinois filmmakers and highlight the Illinois landscape and setting. Heroes and Heroines showcase films about ordinary people doing extraordinary things, emerging as heroes and heroines as the result of their journey.

Film screenings are open to the public with the cost of admission being $10 per ticket. Audience members are asked to vote after each screening in order to unearth the winning films for each film category. Festival judges also select films for official awards. New talent has been discovered every year and some films go on to be honored at other festivals, distributed by companies such as Netflix and have even been nominated at the Academy Awards.

== Awards ==
The awards that were presented at the 2015 festival went to the winners of the Festival Prize, Judge's Choice, and Best Foreign Language Film.

Award	Film	Director	Additional Notes
Festival Prize: Best Foreign Language Short (In-Competition)	The Vanishing Hitchhiker (film)	Rosario Brucato	
Festival Prize: Best Foreign Short (In-Competition)	Sundown	Sinem Cezayirli	
Festival Prize: Best Debut Film (In-Competition)	I Am Good	Noora Albright	
Hugh Moore Best of Festival: Best of Festival - Winner	Writer's Cramp	Darva Campbell	Once Upon a Thyme Productions
Best Debut Film: Best Debut Film - Winner	Writer's Cramp	Darva Campbell	Once Upon a Thyme Productions
Best Foreign Language Film: Winner	Love at First Sight	Mark Playne	1st Sight Films
Judge's Choice: Best Experimental Film	StalkerZ	Damien Patrik	
Judge's Choice: Best Mockumentary	Directors on Directing	Damien Patrik	
