= The Different Being =

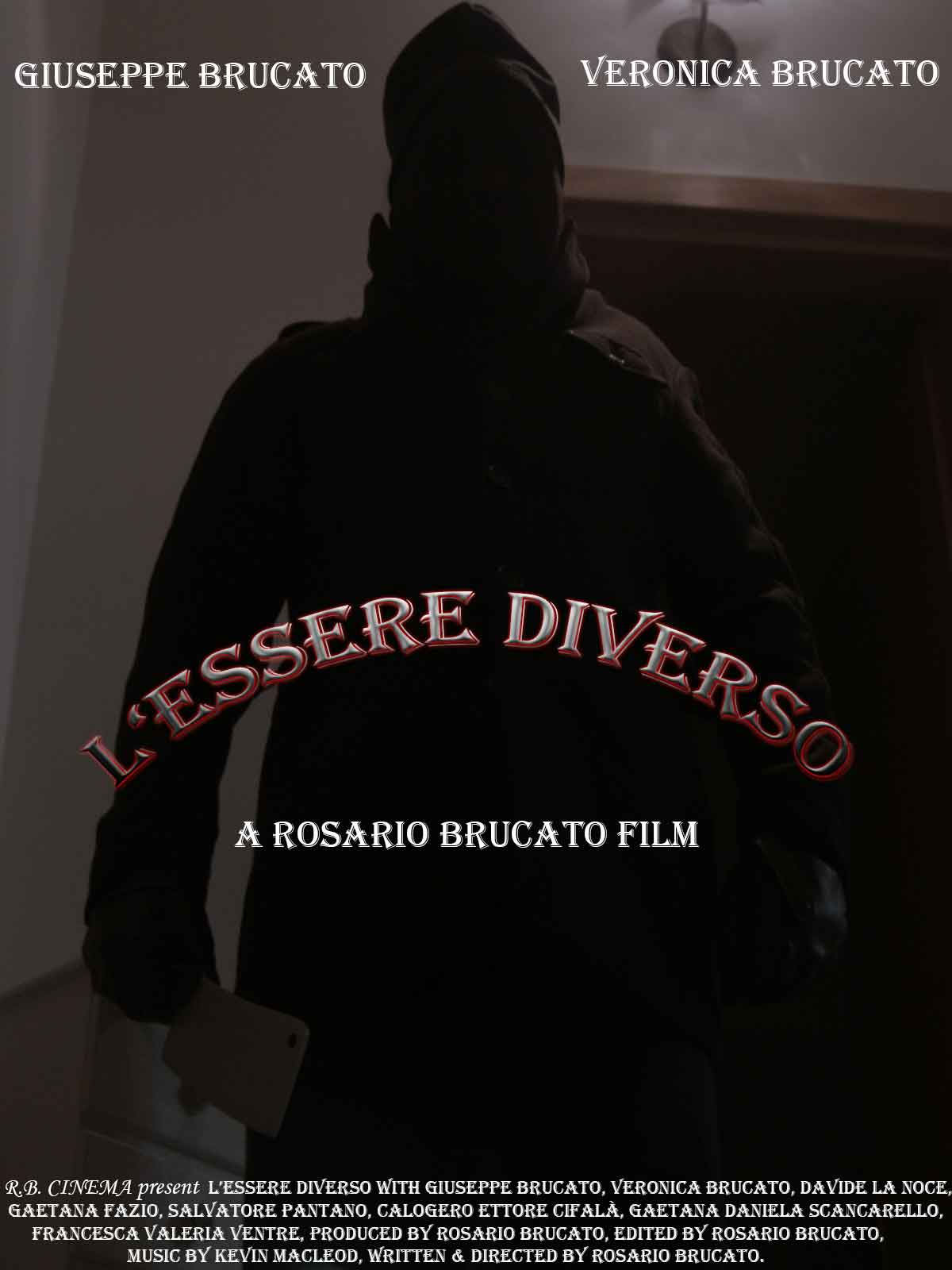
- Poster of film
- Directed by: Rosario Brucato
- Written by: Rosario Brucato
- Produced by: Rosario Brucato
- Starring: Giuseppe Brucato; Veronica Brucato; Gaetana Fazio; Gaetana Daniela Scancarello; Calogero Ettore Cifalà; Davide La Noce; Francesca Valeria Ventre; Salvatore Pantano
- Cinematography: Rosario Brucato
- Edited by: Rosario Brucato
- Music by: Kevin MacLeod
- Production company: R.B. Cinema
- Distributed by: Amazon Prime Video
- Release date: 2017
- Running time: 16 minutes
- Country: Italy
- Language: Italian

The Different Being (Italian: L'essere diverso) is a 2017 Italian horror-suspense short film, written, directed and edited by Rosario Brucato. The film addresses the theme of diversity in a social context that does not accept physical malformations in human beings, which leads to severe mental health issues in the affected individuals, negatively impacting their social lives. The film was distributed by Amazon Prime Video.

== Plot ==
Richard Blanz with social problems finds comfort only from the mother who urges him not to close in the house and above all not to get caught. The psychiatrist Fergurson diagnoses a social problem more than psychological. In Richard, with age advancing, he hates all those who mock him and acts violently with a girl who is deformed, talking to her friend hinting at the hunchback. It's Richard who is secluded in a bushy corner and hears them. Richard follows them when he finds the identity card of the young man who laughed at him. He goes to his home where he can enter while the victim reads a book on the bed. The girl smiles in the stairs and goes down to the kitchen to close the door with the key. Richard is already at home and is staging him...

== Cast ==
- Giuseppe Brucato as Richard Blanz
- Veronica Brucato as victim
- Gaetana Fazio as Richard's mother
- Daniela Scancarello Gaetana as victim's friend
- Davide La Noce as Dr. Fergurson, the psychiatrist
- Calogero Ettore Cifalà as young Richard Blanz
- Francesca Valeria Ventre as young Richard's mother
- Salvatore Pantano as Richard's visitor

== Awards and nominations ==
The Different Being (Italian: L'essere diverso) was filmed on a zero budget and has garnered several nominations and victories at various international festivals, mainly in Los Angeles and Hollywood.

The film's recognition at these festivals highlights its success in the independent film circuit. It also received multiple awards, including the Outstanding Achievement Award for Debut Filmmaker at the Calcutta International Cult Film Festival in 2018 in Calcutta, India. and the Best Editing Award at the Best Independents Film Festival in Baden-Württemberg, Germany, in 2017.

Distributed through Amazon Prime Video, The Different Being reached a wider audience and was praised for its social themes and innovative approach to horror and suspense.
