= Chemins =

American dietary supplement manufacturer

- Industry: Dietary supplements
- Founded: 1974; 52 years ago
- Founder: James Cameron
- Defunct: 2007
- Fate: Acquired by Nexgen Pharma
- Headquarters: Colorado Springs, Colorado, United States
- Products: Metabolife 356; Formula One
- Number of employees: more than 100 employees

The Chemins Company is a dietary supplement manufacturer based in Colorado Springs, Colorado. The company, founded in 1974 by James Cameron, became embroiled in a series of criminal investigations in 1994 after a woman died and more than 100 other people became ill after taking one of the company's products marketed under the brand name Nature's Nutrition Formula One. The adverse events were later linked to the product having been tainted with ephedrine. A three-year federal investigation, which revealed that the company had doctored records, misled FDA investigators, and purposely hindered inspections, led to Cameron being sentenced to 21 months in prison and him and the company being fined $4.7 million . The company also paid out $750,000 to settle a class action lawsuit alleging that the company's protein powder supplements contained approximately half the protein content and twice the carbohydrate content listed on the label.

Chemins was the manufacturer of dietary supplements for the multi-level marketing companies Metabolife (i.e., Metabolife 356, an ephedra-based supplement that was withdrawn following numerous adverse event reports) and LifeVantage (i.e., Protandim, an herbal-based supplement).

Chemins' assets were acquired by Nexgen Pharma in 2007.

== Nature's Nutrition Formula One ==
Chemins initially came under regulatory scrutiny following a series of serious adverse event reports by consumers of Chemins' Nature's Nutrition Formula One. These reports led to an investigation of Chemins by the U.S. Food and Drug Administration (FDA) Office of Criminal Investigation, U.S. Department of Justice Office of Consumer Litigation, and the U.S. Attorney's Office in Denver, Colorado.

The investigation of Chemins was expanded subsequent to an incident on New Year's Eve 1994, when police officers intercepted a 1,200-pound shipment of ephedrine (a methamphetamine precursor) aboard a truck that had crashed on an icy road near Colorado Springs while en route to an underground methamphetamine manufacturing lab. Container labels indicated to police that the chemicals originated from Chemins; however, when informed about the incident, Chemins president James Cameron denied that the company ever possessed or used ephedrine in its products.

Criminal proceedings were launched against Chemins and Cameron, and on July 7, 2000, following a three-year investigation, a Federal judge in Denver sentenced Cameron to 21 months in jail and fined him and Chemins 4.7 million dollars. In his plea agreement, Cameron admitted that he and his company had labeled Formula One as "all natural" but secretly spiked the product with synthetic pharmaceutical grade drugs, including ephedrine and caffeine and had done so with numerous other products, including one called Supercharge, without notifying consumers. He admitted that the product's labeling failed to disclose the use of the chemicals on the list of ingredients, and that he and his employees had misled FDA investigators and purposely hindered inspections of the company's premises. Chemins actively conspired to hide from the FDA the fact that it possessed the undisclosed ingredients by, among other things, making a late night transfer of the ingredients to an employee's home during an FDA inspection and creating false manufacturing and inventory records that were shown to FDA inspectors. The company had denied using those ingredients after being confronted about it by the FDA.

== Metabolife 356 ==
Chemins produced Metabolife 356, an ephedra-based weight-loss product sold by the multilevel marketing company Metabolife. Chemins was responsible for the design, manufacture, labeling, packaging, advertising, marketing, and promotion of the product. Metabolife 356 and other ephedra-containing supplements were linked to thousands of serious adverse events, including deaths. These deaths caused the U.S. Food and Drug Administration (FDA) to ban the sale of ephedra-containing dietary supplements in 2004. After the withdrawal of Metabolife 356, a congressional investigation found that Metabolife had received thousands of reports of serious adverse events, many occurring in young and otherwise healthy people, and that the company had concealed the reports and acted with "indifference to the health of consumers."

== Protein supplements ==
A class action lawsuit was launched against Chemins in the United States District Court of the District of Colorado on behalf of 10,000 claimants who had purchased the company's protein powder supplements marketed under various brand names. The suit alleged that the products contained approximately half the protein content and twice the carbohydrate content as listed on the label. The case was concluded when Chemins agreed to pay out a $750,000 settlement to reimburse consumers for the full cost of purchases of the products made between January 1, 1993, and January 31, 2002.

== Protandim ==
In 2004, Chemins entered into a contract agreement to formulate and manufacture Protandim, an herbal-based antioxidant supplement sold by the Utah-based multi-level marketing company LifeVantage. In July 2008, LifeVantage announced that it was entering into an agreement with a different manufacturer (Cornerstone Research & Development) to produce Protandim.

== Nexgen Pharma acquisition ==
Chemins' assets were acquired in 2007 by Irvine, California-based Nexgen Pharma, parent company of Vitamer Labs.
