= Shaq's Big Challenge =

- Genre: Reality TV
- Created by: Stephen Lambert
- Starring: Shaquille O'Neal; Kit Maldanado; Ariel Pittsinger; Kevin Evans; James Pistocchi; Chris Britto; Walter Holleger
- Narrated by: Phillip Terrence
- Composer: David Vanacore
- Country of origin: United States
- Original language: English
- No. of episodes: 6 (list of episodes)

Production
- Executive producers: Rick Ringbakk; Shaquille O'Neal
- Producers: Paul Coyne; Clayton Halsey; Tony Yates
- Production location: Broward County, Florida
- Editors: Paul J. Coyne; Clayton Halsey; KC Duggan; Audrey Capotosta
- Running time: 60 minutes
- Production company: RDF USA

Original release
- Network: ABC
- Release: June 26 – July 31, 2007

Shaq's Big Challenge is a reality television television show hosted by Shaquille O'Neal that debuted on ABC with its first episode on June 26, 2007, and concluded its first season on July 31, 2007. It featured Shaq's efforts to help six severely obese middle school aged children from Broward County, Florida lose weight and gain a healthy lifestyle.

The events of the six episodes take place over a period of nine months. The challenge was originally scheduled to last five months, but near the end, Shaq and the kids decided to extend it another four months. All kids started out in either the obese or the morbidly obese category and were unable to produce adequate results in the President's Physical Fitness Test, and by the end they were all within the normal or overweight categories and passed the President's Physical Fitness Test in all areas.

The show debuted to low ratings, though it can be attributed, and is attributed by ABC as well as critics, to the fact that the show shared a time slot with the highly successful America's Got Talent and reruns of the immensely popular House. Critics, parents, and educational institutions lauded the show for its accuracy, humor, emotion, sincerity, and lack of exploitation.

The two schools featured in the show are Pines Middle School and Olsen Middle School, both of which are part of Broward County Public Schools.

== Shaq's Team ==
=== The Kids ===
Name, Age	Weight at start	Weight at end
James Pistocchi, 11	182 lb (83 kg)	157 lb (71 kg); lost 25 lb (11 kg)
Chris Brito, 11	206 lb (93 kg)	129 lb (59 kg); lost 77 lb (35 kg)
Ariel Pittsinger, 14	211 lb (96 kg)	171 lb (78 kg); lost 40 lb (18 kg)
Kevin Evans, 13	230 lb (104 kg)	178 lb (81 kg); lost 52 lb (24 kg)
Kit Maldanado, 14	263 lb (119 kg)	236 lb (107 kg); lost 27 lb (12 kg)
Walter Holleger, 14	285 lb (129 kg)	221 lb (100 kg); lost 64 lb (29 kg)

=== The Experts ===
Name	Occupation
Joy Bauer	Nutritionist, Founder of Joy Bauer Nutrition.
Dale Brown	College Basketball Coach of Louisiana State University, and Shaq's college coach.
Carlon Colker	CEO of Peak Wellness Inc. in Greenwich, Connecticut.
Tyler Florence	Celebrity chef who currently hosts three shows on the Food Network.
William I. Muinos	Medical Doctor and childhood obesity expert.
Tarik Tyler	Professional fitness trainer.

== Episodes ==
#	Airdate	Overview
1	Jun 26, 2007	Debut: NBA star Shaquille O'Neal and a team of health experts tackle childhood obesity by working one-on-one with kids to promote fitness and a healthful diet. First up: The six Florida middle schoolers chosen for the program are introduced. Specialists include chef Tyler Florence and Shaq's college-basketball coach, Dale Brown.
2	Jul 3, 2007	The kids aren't keeping up with their exercise program, so personal trainer Tarik Tyler is brought in to amp up their routine. In addition, nutritionist Joy Bauer offers tips on cooking healthful meals.
3	Jul 10, 2007	Kit drops out of the program, and Shaq tries to talk her dad into letting her return. Meanwhile, Doc and Dale introduce a proposal of 20 minutes of exercise daily during homeroom.
4	Jul 17, 2007	The kids strive to hit a 20-pound (9 kg) weight-loss goal to win tickets to a Miami Heat basketball game, and chef Tyler Florence revamps the menu at their school cafeteria on the cheap.
5	Jul 24, 2007	Shaq's Wellness Wheel pilot program to get more physical education into schools is turning too slowly. Meanwhile, chef Tyler Florence is having trouble persuading the cafeteria that it can afford a more healthful menu.
6	Jul 31, 2007	In the season finale, the kids take the president's physical-fitness test, Dr. Muinos delivers his medical diagnoses, and Shaq and the kids meet with the governor of Florida.
