= Rosario Brucato =

Italian filmmaker (born 1983)

Rosario Brucato (born November 23, 1983 in Nicosia, Sicily, Italy) is an Italian independent filmmaker, screenwriter, film editor, and producer, best known for his short films The Different Being (2017) and The Vanishing Hitchhiker (2020). His films have received awards and have been screened at international film festivals.

== Career ==
In 2017, Brucato wrote, directed, edited, and produced The Different Being, a short film blending elements of horror and psychological suspense. In October that year, the film won an award at a film festival in Los Angeles. The story follows a young man with a physical deformity who, marginalized by society, finds solace only in his psychiatrist and his mother, highlighting themes of discrimination and social exclusion. The film won several awards at international festivals and was distributed on Amazon Prime Video.

In 2020, Brucato released The Vanishing Hitchhiker, a short horror film inspired by the classic urban legend. The film seamlessly blends supernatural and psychological elements, earning praise for its direction, editing, and performances, as well as its atmosphere and suspense. It has won several awards in the horror genre and was distributed by Cineverse.

In addition to his directorial work, Brucato is the founder of R.B. Cinema, an independent production company that produces and promotes his films. His films have been screened internationally.

In 2025, Brucato completed the supernatural horror short film The Evil Brooch, filmed at Villa Malvolti in Venice. The film was named a finalist at the 2026 Bare Bones International Film & Music Festival and a semifinalist at the 2026 Flickers' Rhode Island International Film Festival. The film's color grading was handled by Walter Volpatto.

== Filmography ==
The Different Being (2017) – Short film

The Vanishing Hitchhiker (2020) – Short film

The Evil Brooch (2025) – Short film

== Awards and recognition ==
Brucato has received several awards and festival recognitions, including:

- Bronze Remi Award at the 2021 WorldFest-Houston International Film Festival for The Vanishing Hitchhiker.
- Best Foreign Language Short at the 2021 Bare Bones International Film & Music Festival for The Vanishing Hitchhiker.
- Best of Fest Encores at the 2021 Minneapolis–Saint Paul International Film Festival for The Vanishing Hitchhiker.
- Official Selection at the 2021 Fright Night Film Fest for The Vanishing Hitchhiker, where the film was screened in Kentucky.
- Official Selection at the 2021 Route 66 Film Festival for The Vanishing Hitchhiker.
- Finalist at the 2026 Bare Bones International Film & Music Festival for The Evil Brooch.
- Semifinalist at the 2026 Flickers' Rhode Island International Film Festival for The Evil Brooch.

His work has also been publicly screened at the Dickens Horror Film Festival in Colorado. The Vanishing Hitchhiker was officially selected in both the Berlin Lift-Off Global Network and Extravaganza sections of the international festival The Lift-Off Sessions. In addition, The Different Being received the "Outstanding Achievement Award for Debut Filmmaker" at the Calcutta International Cult Film Festival. Brucato's films have also received awards and nominations for directing, editing and filmmaking at international film festivals in Germany, Spain, and the United States, including Los Angeles, Hollywood, New York, Texas, and other locations across the United States.
