= Protandim =

American multi-level marketing company

Protandim is a herbal dietary supplement marketed with unsupported claims that it can treat a number of medical conditions. The product is a patented mix of five herbal ingredients and sold by LifeVantage Corporation (formerly LifeLine Therapeutics, Lifeline Nutraceuticals, and Yaak River Resources, Inc), a Utah-based multi-level marketing company. The manufacturers of Protandim make no claims that it can prevent or cure any medical conditions. In 2017, LifeVantage was issued a warning letter by the U.S. Food and Drug Administration (FDA) regarding illegal advertising claims on the company's websites suggesting that Protandim can help to cure various ailments, including cancer and diabetes.

== History ==
In 2003, Lifeline Therapeutics, a privately held Denver-based nutraceutical licensing and marketing company, entered into an agreement with Massachusetts biotechnology company CereMedix for the rights to market CMX-1152, an experimental peptide-based compound, under the brand name "Protandim" (also sometimes referred to at that time as "Rholen," "Rejuven8r" and "ependymin"). CereMedix was a ten percent owner of Lifeline and members of the CereMedix management board served on Lifeline's board of directors. CMX-1152 was claimed to upregulate the production of the endogenous antioxidant enzymes superoxide dismutase, catalase, and glutathione peroxidase, and to offset the aging process.

CMX-1152 was due to be marketed as an over the counter anti-aging pill in June 2004 after completing human clinical trials. However, plans to market the CMX-1152 version of Protandim fell through and in April 2004 Lifeline Therapeutics announced that it would instead be marketing a different (non-peptide) dietary supplement under the name "Protandim CF" (to distinguish it from the peptide version initially developed by Cermedix). The new version of Protandim, a combination of five common herbal ingredients including turmeric and green tea was invented following "months of extensive research and development" by Lifeline employees Paul Myhill and William Driscoll (a former oil company executive), who together hold the patent on the product, and it was launched in February 2005. Myhill and Driscoll resigned from the company later that year.

Like CMX-1152, the herbal mixture known as Protandim that supplanted it was marketed by Lifeline as an "anti-aging" supplement that increases the body's antioxidant defenses by upregulating superoxide dismutase, catalase, and glutathione peroxidase. According to the company, the product was initially sold through retail channels such as GNC; however, in 2009, after several consecutive years of multimillion-dollar losses, the company, which by then was doing business under the name LifeVantage, stopped marketing it through retailers and switched to multi-level marketing, selling it instead through a network of commissioned independent distributors. According to LifeVantage, the move from retail to multi-level marketing was prompted by the January 2008 hiring of David W. Brown, (formerly CEO and president of Metabolife) as the company's CEO and president.

Beginning in 2005, Protandim was produced under a manufacturing agreement with The Chemins Company of Colorado Springs, Colorado. In July 2008, LifeVantage entered into a new manufacturing agreement with Cornerstone Research & Development to produce Protandim, and with Wasatch Product Development to produce a Protandim-based skin cream (TrueScience).

In 2006, biochemist Joe M. McCord joined the LifeVantage board of directors as the company's director of science. McCord, who is listed by the U.S. Securities and Exchange Commission as a LifeVantage insider shareholder, served as a spokesperson for Protandim and was responsible for distributor training and product research. Under the terms of his 2011 employment agreement, McCord received $529,994 in direct compensation as well as a 50-cent commission on every bottle of Protandim sold. McCord served as LifeVantage's Chief Scientific Officer from June 2011 until September 2012, and then became a member of its science advisory board. LifeVantage announced McCord's retirement in June 2013. Under the terms of the separation agreement, McCord was to receive a payment of $1.7 million from the company.

In January 2014, McCord was replaced by Shawn Talbott (developer of CortiSlim), who served as the company's chief science officer until being relieved of his duties in June 2015 and replaced in August 2015 by Natalie Chevreau, who was hired as the company's senior vice president of research and development and is credited with the invention of the company's TruScience skin care product.

=== Product invention ===
As recently as July 21, 2011, LifeVantage credited McCord as the creator of Protandim on its website. At a 2011 conference for LifeVantage distributors, McCord stated, "I was presented with a list of 41 potential ingredients for a product they wanted to call Protandim, and I went through the list and penciled out, rapidly, about 36 of those ingredients," leaving the 5 ingredients in the current formulation of Protandim. In March 2009, former LifeLine Therapeutics executive, Paul Myhill stated, "We initially decided to hide that fact [that Myhill derived the core composition for Protandim] for marketing purposes and instead rely on the impeccable background of Dr. McCord." In April, 2005, Myhill produced a signed letter from McCord in which McCord stated, "I do not honestly feel that I have made contributions to the intellectual property, up to this point, that would qualify me as an inventor...I must congratulate you and Paul for having framed the concept of Protandim so close to its final embodiment, prior to the beginnings of our association."

== Composition ==
Protandim consists mainly of a blend of five herbal ingredients (amounts per caplet listed in parentheses):

- Milk thistle (Silybum marianum) extract (70–80% Silymarin) (225 mg)
- Bacopa (Bacopa monnieri) extract (45% bacosides) (150 mg)
- Ashwagandha (Withania somnifera) powder (150 mg)
- Green tea (Camellia sinensis) extract (98% polyphenols, 45% EGCG) (75 mg)
- Turmeric (Curcuma longa) extract (95% curcumin) (75 mg)

== Effectiveness ==
Marketing claims that Protadim can prevent or treat cancer are unproven and have been deemed fraudulent by the FDA. Research into use as a treatment for amyotrophic lateral sclerosis is of poor quality, casting doubt on its usefulness for drawing any conclusions about efficacy.

In 2011, Harriet A. Hall wrote for Science-Based Medicine that "we simply don't know enough at this point to recommend Protandim for treatment or prevention of any disease, for anti-aging, for making people feel healthier or more energetic, or for anything else".

== Side effects ==
According to the manufacturer, Protandim can cause allergic responses, gastrointestinal disturbances (stomach ache, diarrhea, vomiting), headache, and a rash on the hands and feet.

== Legal and regulatory issues ==
=== Protandim voluntary recall ===
In December 2012, LifeVantage issued a voluntary recall of select lots (ten lots in total comprising 247,896 bottles) of Protandim due to potential health risks arising from the possible inclusion of small metal fragments in the final product. In February 2013, the company announced that it was extending the recall to include additional lots of the product, estimating the total cost of the recall at $5.9 million.

=== FDA Warning for illegal marketing ===
On April 17, 2017, LifeVantage was issued a warning letter by the U.S. Food and Drug Administration (FDA) regarding illegal advertising claims on the company's websites suggesting that Protandim can play a role in helping to cure various ailments, including cancer and diabetes. The claims were deemed to be in violation of Section 201(g)(1)(B) of the Federal Food, Drug, and Cosmetic Act [21 U.S.C. § 321(g)(1)(B)].

=== Other ===
In 2009, LifeVantage was sued by Utah-based Zrii LLC, a marketer of nutritional fruit drinks endorsed by Deepak Chopra, based on allegations that LifeVantage had conspired with former Zrii executives to "ruin the company" and take it over “on the cheap” following a "mass exodus". The case was closed in December 2009 following LifeVantage's settlement payment of $400,000 to Zrii.

On October 14, 2011, Burke Hedges, a former LifeVantage distributor (hired for his background as a speaker and trainer) filed a lawsuit with the Utah District Court against LifeVantage and its executives, seeking $3 million in punitive damages over allegations of wrongful termination and tortious interference.

In September 2016, a class action lawsuit was filed against LifeVantage in Utah alleging that the company and its executive Darren Jensen and Mark Jaggi made false and/or misleading statements, as well as failed to disclose material adverse facts about the Company's business, operations, and prospects. Specifically, the case alleged that the defendants made false and/or misleading statements and/or failed to disclose that: (i) LifeVantage lacked effective internal financial controls; (ii) as a result, the Company had improperly accounted for sales in certain international markets, along with associated revenue and income tax accruals; and (iii) as a result of the foregoing, LifeVantage's public statements were materially false and misleading at all relevant times. The case was dismissed in June 2017.

In January 2018, a class action lawsuit was filed against LifeVantage in Connecticut alleging that the company and its chief executive officer Darren Jensen, chief sales officer Justin Rose, and chief marketing officer Ryan Goodwin were operating an illegal pyramid scheme in violation of the RICO Act, federal securities laws, and the Connecticut Unfair Trade Practices Act.

== Promotional sponsorship ==
Major League Soccer team Real Salt Lake announced on October 29, 2013, that it had partnered with LifeVantage for a long-term, multimillion-dollar jersey-front sponsorship. The partnership was set to formally go into effect on January 1, 2014, with the LifeVantage logo appearing on the Real Salt Lake jersey starting in the next season. In July 2015, Real Salt Lake owner Dell Loy Hansen was reported by the U.S. Securities and Exchange Commission to have bought a 5.1 percent ownership stake in LifeVantage.

== See also ==
- List of unproven and disproven cancer treatments
- Quackery
