= CortiSlim =

Dietary supplement brand

CortiSlim was marketed as a "cortisol control weight loss formula" by CortiSlim international Inc. CortiSlim contains three proprietary blends: Cortiplex, Leptiplex, and Insutrol, as well as vitamin C, calcium, and chromium. Cortiplex purportedly "controls cortisol levels within a healthy range to help reduce fat stage and promote fat mobilization – especially fat stored around the midsection in the tough-to-lose abdominal area" and consists of magnolia bark extract (Magnolia officinalis; 1–5% honokiol), beta-sitoserol, and SuntheanineB (1 00% L-theanine). Leptiplex purportedly "helps to naturally control appetite, increase energy levels, and stimulate metabolism" and consists of green tea leaf extract (Camellia sinenisis; 50% epigallocatechin gallate [EGCG]) and bitter orange peel extract (Citrus aurantium; 5% synephrine). Insutrol purportedly "balances blood sugar and insulin levels to help reduce cravings and let you stick to your healthy eating plan" and consists of banana leaf extract (Lagerstromia speciosa; 1 % corosolic acid) and vanadyl sulfate (vanadium).

The CortiSlim line of products was acquired from its original owner, Window Rock Enterprises in 2008 after Window Rock had been pushed into bankruptcy as a result of losing a lawsuit for false advertising by the Federal Trade Commission.

== Ingredients ==
1. Magnolia Bark Extract
2. Beta-sitoserol
3. SuntheanineB
4. Green Tea Leaf extract
5. Bitter orange peel extract
6. Banana leaf extract

== Product Details ==
Total Weight: 0.25 lbs (0.11 kg)

UPC: 858949002001

Item #: 4282

Package Format: 90 Capsules

Origin: Made In USA

== False Advertisement ==
Window Rock Enterprises, the former owners of the CortiSlim product line, originally claimed that it contributed to weight loss by blocking cortisol. The manufacturer was fined $12 million by the Federal Trade Commission in 2007 for false advertising, and, as part of the settlement, the current owner of the brand no longer claims that CortiSlim is a cortisol antagonist. CortiSlim product promoters also claimed that the effectiveness of CortiSlim products had been demonstrated by over 15 years of scientific research, a claim that the FTC determined to be false.
