= Metabolife =

Former multi-level marketing company

Metabolife International, Inc.
- Type: Multi-level marketing
- Industry: Medicine, weight loss
- Founded: Early 1990s in San Diego, California, US
- Founder: Michael Ellis; Michael Blevins
- Defunct: 2005
- Fate: Bankruptcy; non-ephedra assets acquired by Ideasphere Inc.
- Products: Dietary supplements
- Website: Official website

Metabolife International, Inc. was a multi-level marketing company based in San Diego, California, which manufactured dietary supplements. Metabolife's best-selling product, an ephedra supplement called Metabolife 356, once generated hundreds of millions of dollars in annual sales. However, Metabolife 356 and other ephedra-containing supplements were linked to thousands of serious adverse events, including deaths, which caused the U.S. Food and Drug Administration (FDA) to ban the sale of ephedra-containing dietary supplements in 2004.

Subsequently, Metabolife's founder Michael Ellis was convicted of lying to the FDA and concealing evidence of ephedra's dangers, and the company and its owner were both convicted of income tax evasion. A congressional investigation found that Metabolife had received thousands of reports of serious adverse events, many occurring in young and otherwise healthy people, and that Metabolife concealed the reports and acted with "indifference to the health of consumers."

== History ==
Metabolife was founded in the early 1990s by Michael Ellis, a former police officer on probation for charges relating to his involvement with a methamphetamine lab. Ellis and a boyhood friend, Michael Blevins, were arrested in 1989 for producing and distributing methamphetamine. Both Ellis and Blevins cooperated with federal authorities in return for lighter sentences. Following Blevins' release from prison, the two formed Metabolife to market ephedra, a herbal supplement containing compounds chemically related to methamphetamine. Ellis served as the company's CEO until September 2000, when he was succeeded by David Brown (Brown went on to serve as president and CEO of LifeVantage in 2008).

Metabolife 356, an ephedra supplement manufactured by Chemins, was initially marketed by Metabolife as a bodybuilding supplement, but in 1995 was rebranded as an aid for dieting. The product became highly successful due to a marketing plan that enlisted customers to advertise and sell the supplement; at their peak, sales of Metabolife 356 were in the hundreds of millions of dollars annually. At one point, Metabolife offered the Russian government $15 million to paint its logo on an International Space Station rocket and incorporate Metabolife's ephedra supplement into the diet of its cosmonauts.

== Regulation and lobbying ==
In the late 1990s, the U.S. FDA considered regulating ephedra more strictly, in response to reports of adverse reactions and more than 100 deaths linked to the supplement. These included reports of psychosis, heart attack, stroke, and diabetic ketoacidosis. A clinical trial conducted to address safety concerns found that Metabolife 356 increased blood pressure and induced mild cardiac arrhythmias; the trial concluded that there were serious safety concerns associated with the use of Metabolife.

Metabolife took an active role in lobbying against regulation of ephedra, forming an advocacy group called the Dietary Supplement Safety and Science Coalition and contributing heavily to Congressmen Brian Bilbray (R-Calif.) and Dan Burton (R-Ind.), among other politicians. Bilbray subsequently criticized the FDA's treatment of Metabolife and its efforts to regulate ephedra. During this period in the late 1990s, Metabolife contributed $1.6 million in soft money to both political parties, and almost $3 million to lobbyists. At the state level, Metabolife contributed $10,000 to then-governor of Texas George W. Bush, who intervened to stop regulation which would have banned over-the-counter sales of ephedra. Bush subsequently returned the $10,000 after Ellis' and Blevins' methamphetamine convictions were publicized in the media. Other recipients of Metabolife contributions included then-Governor of California Joseph Graham 'Gray' Davis, Jr., who was given $175,000.

== Legal issues ==
Metabolife was investigated by the Internal Revenue Service and the Department of Justice for income tax evasion; ultimately, the company pleaded guilty to filing fraudulent tax returns and was sentenced to pay a criminal fine of $600,000. Metabolife owner William Bradley also pleaded guilty to evading millions of dollars in taxes and was sentenced to 6 months in federal prison and 2 years of probation.

According to federal prosecutors in the case against Metabolife and its executives, the company's certified public accountant, Michael Compton, knew about and helped conceal Metabolife's illegal activities. Compton had admitted falsifying tax returns for company executives and was complicit in the company's failure to account for $93.7 million in income on its income tax returns from 1996 through 1999. Compton had assisted the company in setting up secret offshore bank accounts and trusts in the Cayman Islands and was aware that Bradley, Ellis, and Blevins each had over $1 million in unreported cash concealed in safes within their homes. In July 2002, criminal investigators of the Internal Revenue Service raided Compton's office, seizing documents and computer data, and in November 2003, 10 days after a warrant against Metabolife and its principals was unsealed in U.S. District Court, Compton died from a self-inflicted gunshot wound to the head.

Some of the politicians associated with Metabolife also encountered legal difficulties; Texas state legislators Jeff Wentworth and Rick Green were accused of illegal lobbying on behalf of the company.

Following the FDA's ban of ephedra, Michael Ellis was indicted on eight counts of making false statements to the FDA in an effort to obstruct regulation of ephedra. Ellis ultimately pled guilty to a single count of lying to the FDA about the adverse effects of Metabolife 356. He was sentenced to 6 months in federal prison and a $20,000 fine.

In response to falling sales, and facing more than $1 billion in personal injury legal claims related to Metabolife 356, Metabolife filed for Chapter 11 bankruptcy in 2005. The company's furnishings and property, including a large collection of artwork, were liquidated in late 2006 to compensate creditors and settle outstanding personal-injury claims.

Metabolife's non-ephedra assets were acquired by Ideasphere Inc., a New York-based dietary-supplement manufacturer, for $12 million in 2007. In 2008, Michael Ellis authored a memoir entitled The Metabolife Story: The Rape of Cinderella, with a testimonial by the former FBI special agent who arrested Ellis in 1989 for producing and distributing methamphetamine.
