= Javad Daraei =

Iranian filmmaker (born 1992)

- جواد دارایی
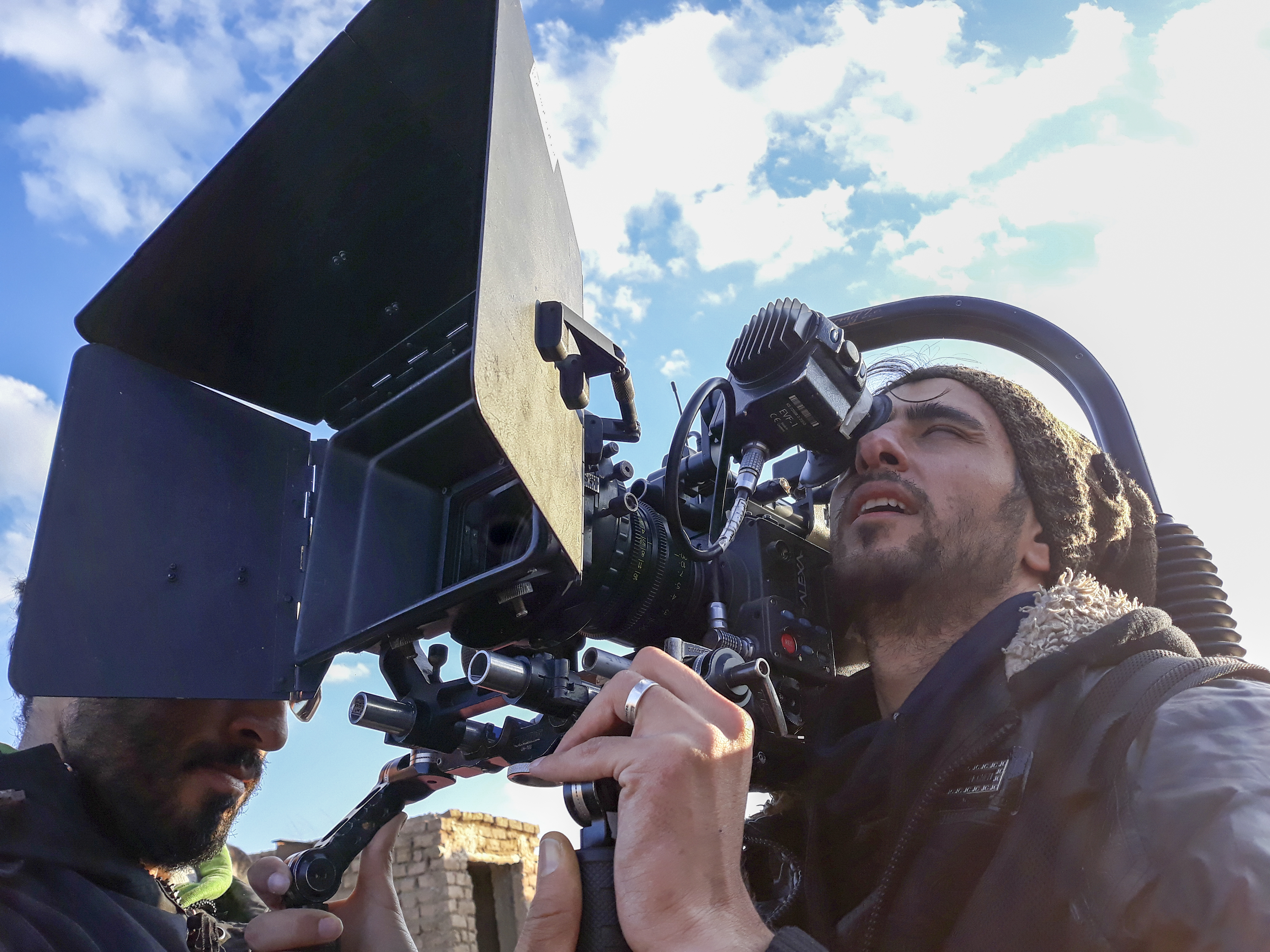
- Born: 27 February 1992 (age 34); Khorramabad, Iran
- Occupation: Filmmaker
- Years active: 2016–present
- Notable work: Metamorphosis in the Slaughterhouse
- Website: javaddaraei.com

Javad Daraei (Persian:جواد دارایی, born 1992) is a British-Iranian film director, screenwriter, and playwright, known for his underground films that expose the harsh realities faced by persecuted minorities in Iran—including women, LGBTQ+ individuals, and people with disabilities. A survivor of torture and political imprisonment by the Islamic Revolutionary Guard Corps (IRGC) He is an alumnus of IASH from the University of Edinburgh .

He is known for directing the short films “I Don’t Like Here” (2016) and “Limit” (2017), His short films have screened at several Academy-qualifying festivals, ang his feature debut Metamorphosis in the Slaughterhouse (2021) won multiple awards in the United States and Europe despite being made under highly restricted and clandestine conditions in Iran.

His work often explores themes of trauma, exile, identity, and survival. As he has said: “Before, I used to write to live. Now, I write just to survive.”.

== Career ==
Daraei, an award-winning underground filmmaker, is a storyteller who captures his life in Iran. His films cover LGBTQ+ and queer individuals, disabled individuals, and women, portraying their struggles with a Kafkaesque intensity, often in abandonded villages.. The cinematic style of Daraei, particularly in his critically acclaimed work Metamorphosis in the Slaughterhouse, is marked by minimalistic movements and arid shots that focus on solitary figures. He prioritizes being frugal yet thorough with his filmmaking. Despite being arrested by Iranian authorities and having his work censored, Daraei continues his filmography, with his arrests being a main source of inspiration for his art.

== Early life and education ==
Daraei was born in 1992 in Khorramabad, a conservative, religious city nestled in the mountainous Lorestan province of western Iran. Raised primarily by his grandmother, Daraei credits her as a profound emotional anchor during his formative years, shaping his resilience and artistic sensitivity.

Driven by a passion for cinema, he moved to Tehran to study film, where he immersed himself in underground art communities. There, he encountered marginalized groups, including LGBTQ+ individuals, whose stories of fear and persecution deeply influenced his work.

Facing severe repression for his bold storytelling, Daraei endured imprisonment and brutal torture by the Islamic Revolutionary Guard Corps (IRGC). Despite these harrowing experiences, he continued to create, fueled by the belief that art could bear witness to injustice.

After fleeing Iran Daraei found refuge in Scotland. He was supported by the University of Edinburgh’s Institute for Advanced Studies in the Humanities (IASH), which provided crucial mentorship and resources to help him rebuild his artistic voice. He also enhanced his craft by completing a documentary directing course at the National Film and Television School (NFTS) in the UK.

== Arrest and torture ==
During and after the production of Metamorphosis in the Slaughterhouse, Daraei was abducted by plainclothes agents of the Islamic Revolutionary Guard Corps (IRGC). In 2017, while walking down the street, he was ambushed, forced into an unmarked car, and taken to an undisclosed detention centre.

He was confined in a tiny, windowless cell, lit continuously by a halogen lamp and filled with the incessant hum of a ceiling fan—a sensory environment he later described as a method of psychological torture. While in custody, Daraei was falsely accused of being an American spy.

Over the course of 17 days, he endured severe physical and psychological abuse. He was beaten repeatedly, burned with a lighter, and suffered a broken leg that was never treated. “Every day they got more and more brutal,” he later recalled. “I refused to eat. It was mental and physical torture. I no longer felt human.

== Exile, trauma, and recovery ==
Daraei was eventually released into a state-run hospital. He later left Iran and was granted refugee status and the right to remain in the UK.

He suffers from ongoing trauma as a result of his imprisonment and torture. He experiences flashbacks and avoids warm weather, which reminds him of the summer heat in detention. Therapy, community support in Scotland, and his creative work have helped him begin to heal. He keeps a photo of the Scottish Highlands on his bedroom wall as a daily reminder of his safety.

“Before, I used to write to live. Now, I write just to survive. Which means that as long as I’m writing, I’m still alive."

== Movies ==
=== Full-length films ===
- Metamorphosis in the Slaughterhouse (2021)

=== Short narrative films ===
- I don't like here (2016)
- Limit (2017)
