= Poppy Jasper International Film Festival =

California film festival

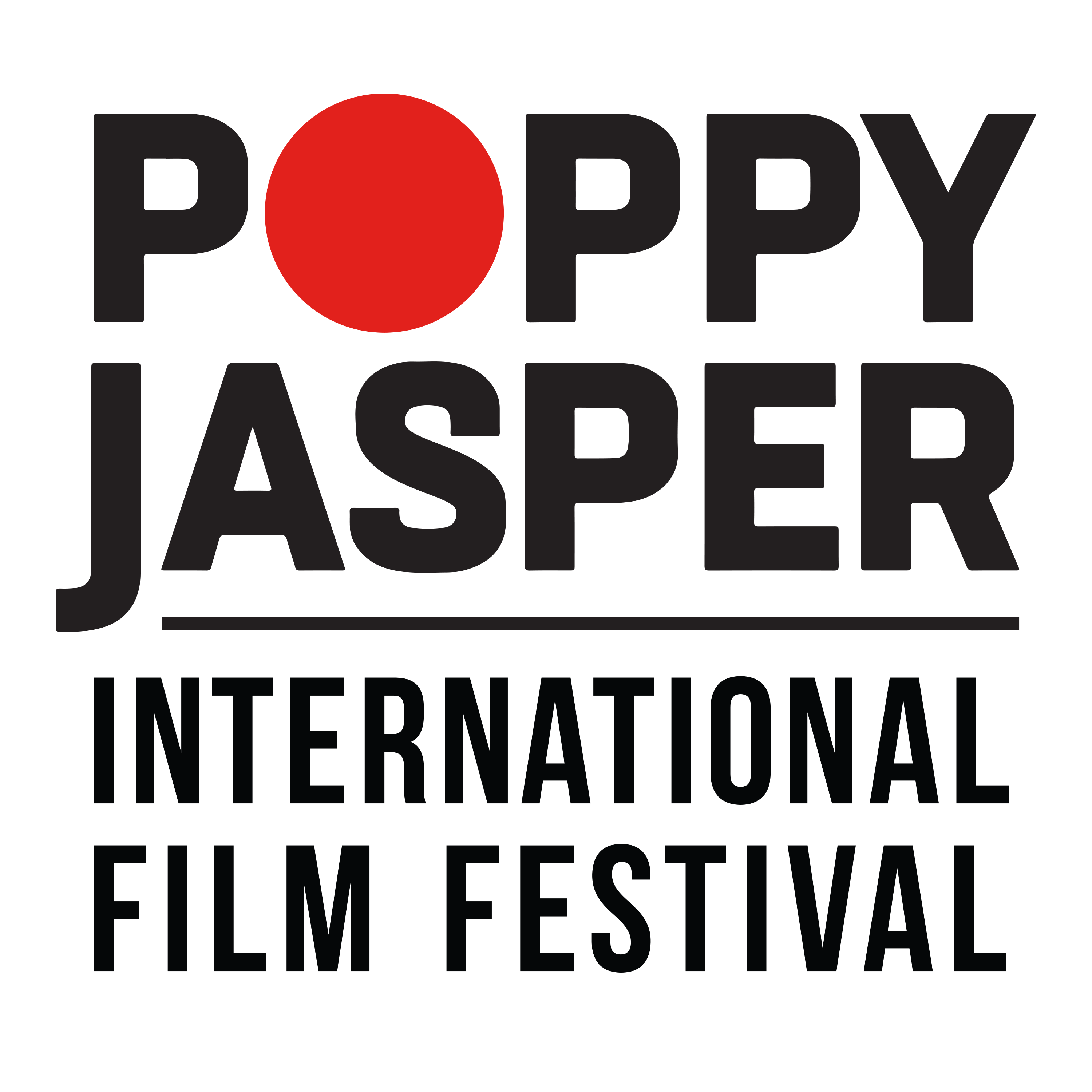
- Location: Morgan Hill, California
- Founded by: L. Mattock Scariot
- Festival date: April
- Website: pjiff.org

The Poppy Jasper International Film Festival (PJIFF) is a film festival based in Morgan Hill, California, founded in 2004 by L. Mattock Scariot. Poppy Jasper is an annual event produced by volunteers as part of Poppy Jasper, Inc., a 501(c)(3) nonprofit organization. The event is fourteen days of online and in-person film screenings, speaker panels and awards. It is named after the poppy jasper, a gem endemic to Morgan Hill.

MovieMaker Magazine named Poppy Jasper to its list of 25 Film Festivals Worth the Entry Fee.
