= Academy of Interactive & Visual Arts =

Professional organization associated with creative and digital media awards

- Abbreviation: AIVA
- Founded: 2006
- Type: Invitation-only professional organization
- Headquarters: New York City, United States
- Fields: Visual arts, interactive media, advertising, marketing, communications and digital media
- Members: 1,100
- Key people: Eva McCloskey (Managing Director)
- Affiliations: Communicator Awards, w3 Awards, Davey Awards
- Website: www.aiva.org

The Academy of Interactive & Visual Arts (AIVA), formerly known as the International Academy of the Visual Arts (IAVA), is a New York City-based professional organization of awards programs in creative digital media, advertising, marketing, interactive media, and visual arts.

== Organization and membership ==
AIVA membership is by invitation only and is made up of professionals in the visual arts, interactive media, advertising, marketing, and communications industry. The organization consisted of 600 creative professionals in 2014. Membership increased to 800 in 2020 and 1,100 in 2026 across 15 countries.

AIVA jurors have included executives from JPMorgan Chase & Co., Digitas, American Express, Discovery Communications, FedEx, Netflix, National Geographic Society, Accenture, Spotify, and CarGurus.

== Awards programs ==
=== Communicator awards ===
The Communicator Awards are an AIVA-judged awards program for marketing, communications, and creative work. The program recognizes work in advertising, corporate communications, public relations, print, video and audio. By 2010, the program had received thousands of entries from the United States and other countries.

The 2022 edition was the program’s 28th annual competition and received more than 4,000 entries from ad agencies, digital agencies, production firms, in-house creative professionals, graphic designers, design firms, and public relations firms. The 2026 edition was the program’s 32nd annual competition and received more than 3,000 entries.

=== w3 awards ===
The w3 Awards are an AIVA-judged and curated awards program for digital experiences, digital content and digital creativity. The program was founded in 2006 to recognize websites and digital marketing before expanding into categories covering video, social and mobile work. In 2014, the w3 Awards received more than 4,000 entries from advertising agencies, creative professionals, and designers.

The 2019 w3 Awards included nearly 1,000 participating companies from more than 30 markets and more than 5,000 submitted works. The 2019 edition included jury members associated with Disney,The Ellen DeGeneres Show, Microsoft, MTV, Ralph Lauren, and Wired. The same edition included Best in Show winners associated with Google, Samsung, NASA, BMW, and Dell.

In 2020, the w3 Awards underwent a 15th-anniversary rebrand under AIVA's managing director, Eva McCloskey. The rebrand broadened the program’s recognition of digital creators and expanded its judging body by more than 100 judges. The 2021 edition had more than 3,000 entries and recognized work associated with Adidas, Nestlé, Amazon, IBM, Coca-Cola, IKEA, Taco Bell, Deloitte, and Forbes.

=== Davey awards ===
The Davey Awards are an AIVA-associated awards program focused on work from small agencies, small teams, and independent creators. The awards program was grouped with AIVA’s wider awards structure for creative and digital work in 2020.

== 2022 U.S. House inquiry ==
In February 2022, U.S. House Committee on Natural Resources chair Raúl Grijalva and Oversight and Investigations Subcommittee chair Katie Porter requested documents from McCloskey as part of a congressional investigation into public-relations campaigns run on behalf of clients in the fossil-fuel industry.

The letter sought information about AIVA’s recognition of public relations firms for their work on climate change campaigns, including nominations, applications and other records related to work for oil, natural gas and coal interests.

In a committee memorandum released in September 2022, AIVA was named as one of six entities that give awards in the public relations industry from which the committee had sought information, including PRWeek and Haymarket Media Group. The investigation grew to include several public-relations firms and the American Petroleum Institute.
