= LGBTQ culture in Haiti =

LGBTQ culture in Haiti encompasses the various artistic and leisure manifestations existing in the country whose focus is sexual diversity, or which includes the participation of LGBTQ people within them.

== Events ==
On November 30, 2008, the first LGBTQ Pride March in Haiti was held in the city of Saint-Marc. The event brought together around a dozen people who marched wearing t-shirts bearing the word masisi ("faggot") as a form of reclaiming the term.

In 2016, an attempt was made to hold a Haitian edition of the Massimadi Festival — which originated in Montreal, Canada, and celebrates the Black LGBTQ community — but it was cancelled before it could take place in Port-au-Prince due to threats of violence from homophobic protesters.

The first edition of "Festi Fierté", an artistic and cultural festival marking the first celebration of LGBTQ Pride Month in Haiti, was held in Port-au-Prince from June 20 to 23, 2023.

== Literature ==
The majority of Haitian literary works that address homosexuality do not do so in relation to sexual identity itself; rather, the subject is treated in connection with themes of violence and moral decadence. In 1995, In the Footsteps of Diogène by Jean-Elie Gilles was published, considered one of the first Haitian novels to openly address the homosexuality of its protagonist.

In 1997, La Chair du Maître ("The Master's Flesh") by Dany Laferrière depicts a lesbian relationship between two women competing for the same man. The novel La dernière goutte d'homme ("The Last Drop of Man") by Jean-Claude Fignolé, published in 1999, portrays a turbulent homosexual relationship between two protagonists set against a backdrop of sociopolitical violence and a wave of homicides in Port-au-Prince. L'heure hybride ("Hybrid Time") by Kettly Mars, published in 2005, is a novel whose protagonist is a womanizing gigolo who, toward the end of the story, discovers his attraction to men — a development framed within the narrative as "a fall" or "a rupture."

Haitian LGBTQ poetry has counted among its exponents Assotto Saint, who developed the greater part of his artistic career in the United States, and Ida Faubert, who during the 1920s and 1930s wrote and published several poems dedicated to other women.

== Other cultural expressions ==
LGBTQ cinema has not seen extensive development in Haiti. In 2002, the documentary Of Men and Gods was released, examining the lives of several openly gay Haitian men and the discrimination they face, while also exploring other aspects of Haitian culture such as Vodou.

Josué Azor is a photographer who has traveled throughout Haiti since 2008, documenting — among other subjects — the LGBTQ nightlife of Port-au-Prince through his series titled "Noctámbulos" (Night Owls).

Drag performance has produced figures who have built their careers abroad, one of the most notable being Love Masisi, who became the first Haitian drag queen to compete in a franchise installment of Drag Race, participating in the second season of Drag Race Holland.

== See also ==
- LGBTQ rights in Haiti
- Haitian Vodou and homosexuality
