= LGBTQ rights in Haiti =

- Haiti
- Legal status: Legal since 1791
- Gender identity: No
- Discrimination protections: None

Family rights
- Recognition of relationships: No recognition of same-sex unions
- Adoption: No

Lesbian, gay, bisexual, transgender, and queer (LGBTQ) persons in Haiti face social and legal challenges not experienced by non-LGBTQ residents. Adult, noncommercial and consensual same-sex sexuality is not a criminal offense, but transgender people can be fined for violating a broadly written vagrancy law. Public opinion tends to be opposed to LGBTQ rights, which is why LGBTQ people are not protected from discrimination, are not included in hate crime laws, and households headed by same-sex couples do not have any of the legal rights given to married couples.

== Legality of same-sex sexual activity ==
Homosexuality laws in Central America and the Caribbean Islands. Same-sex marriage Other type of partnership Unregistered cohabitation No recognition of same-sex couples Constitution limits marriage to opposite-sex couples Same-sex sexual activity illegal but law not enforced

The French Penal Code of 1791, adopted between 25 September and 6 October 1791, extended to Saint-Domingue. When Haiti became independent from France in 1804, no law that criminalized consensual same-sex sexual acts was introduced, and no such law has come into the penal code since.

== Recognition of same-sex relationships ==
Haiti does not recognize same-sex marriages, civil unions or similar institutions. In 2013, Christian and Muslim religious leaders organized a large public demonstration against gay marriage, when a Haitian LGBTQ rights group announced plans to lobby for a gay rights bill in the parliament.

In August 2017, a bill to jail same-sex couples who get married for three years, with a fine of $8,000, passed the Haitian Senate, but never became law.

== Discrimination protections ==
Haitian law does not have a hate crimes or bias-motivated crime law to address harassment and violence directed at LGBTQ people. The Constitution of Haiti, ratified in 1987, does not expressly prohibit discrimination on the account of sexual orientation or gender identity. However, the Constitution does make certain guarantees to all citizens, including a right to health care, housing, education, food and social security.

On 24 June 2020, President Jovenel Moïse decreed a new penal code, scheduled to take effect 24 months later unless rejected by a newly elected parliament. Among its provisions, the proposed code would criminalize discrimination based on sexual orientation. The reform was part of a broader overhaul of the criminal code, which also included unrelated changes, such as the decriminalization of adultery. The proposed penal code generated significant opposition from conservative political figures and religious organizations, some of whom publicly pledged to reject it.

== Social attitudes and viewpoints ==
Most Haitians have strong ties to a religion or denomination that views homosexuality and cross-dressing negatively. Roughly fifty percent of the population is Catholic, and the second and third main religious groups in Haiti, Pentecostalism and Islam, also tend to have negative views about same-sex sexuality and cross-dressing.

As a result of these attitudes and viewpoints, LGBTQ people often feel the need to be discreet about their sexual orientation or gender identity for fear of being targeted for discrimination or harassment. While the Haiti government has allowed an LGBTQ rights movement to exist, public support is almost nonexistent.

The major social exception is Vodou which, as a spiritual practice and belief, possesses little discrimination against LGBTQ people.

More than 1,000 people participated in Port-au-Prince in July 2013 to protest homosexuality and a proposal to legalize gay marriage. The protest brought together a mix of religious groups from Protestant to Muslim, who carried anti-gay placards and chanted songs, including one in which they threatened to burn down parliament if its members make same-sex marriage legal. The coalition of religious groups said that it opposed laws in other countries supporting gay marriage.

=== LGBTQ culture ===
LGBTQ film festivals and parades do not occur in Haiti, and there are no bars or nightclubs to cater to LGBTQ patrons. For the most part, the social life of LGBTQ people in Haiti is still largely low-key and, much like the rest of the country, divided by economic class.

In 2002, a documentary about gay Haitians was released titled Of Men and Gods. The film examines the lives of several openly gay Haitian men and the discrimination that they face. There has since been a significant amount of academic work on LGBTQ culture in Haiti by Erin L. Durban, Omise'eke Natasha Tinsley, Dasha A. Chapman, Mario LaMothe, and Elizabeth McAlister. These speakers were featured at a 2015 symposium about LGBTQ culture in Haiti at Duke University. In 2017, Chapman, Durban, and LaMothe published a pathbreaking journal issue "Nou Mache Ansanm (We Walk Together: Queer Haitian Performance and Affiliation" that invoked "queer Haitian studies" as an academic field of study for the first time. In 2024, another special journal issue in this field dedicated to "The Rights to Live Creatively" was published by the Journal of Haitian Studies and edited by Chapman, Mamyrah A. Dougé-Prosper, and LaMothe.

The Massimadi Festival, a Canadian festival of Black LGBTQ arts and culture, was slated to launch an edition in Port-au-Prince in 2016, but it was cancelled after threats of violence from anti-gay protestors.

Kouraj is a Haitian LGBTQ advocacy group. Its president, activist Charlot Jeudy, was found dead on 25 November 2019. Rumors that he was poisoned are unconfirmed.

=== Treatment by police ===
LGBTQ Haitians who are victims of a crime often do not receive professional treatment from the police, who often share the negative religious attitudes and viewpoints concerning same-sex sexuality and cross-dressing.

Members of the police have been known to engage in harassment themselves and, through their unprofessional behavior, revictimize LGBTQ people.

Justification for the abuse and harassment of LGBTQ seems to stem from traditional attitudes about gender as well as the religious mores.

LGBTQ people are often seen by police as not only being immoral, but violating "normal" rules about how men and women ought to dress and behave.

=== AIDS/HIV ===
As of 2005, as many as sixty percent of Haitians lived in poverty, with roughly two percent of the population infected with HIV. As of 2008, the number of persons infected has risen to 4–6%, with rates increasing to 13% in certain rural neighborhoods.

In 1997, Grasadis was created as an organization that specializes in preventing the spread of HIV/AIDS among the LGBTQ minority as well as working to educate the general public about this minority. Former first lady Mildred Trouillot openly expressed support for Grasadis' work.

== Government policy ==
=== Duvaliers ===
No evidence exists as to whether or not LGBTQ people were specifically targeted during the Duvalier dictatorships. The noted artist Richard Brisson was executed by the dictatorship, although it remains unclear whether or not his sexual orientation was a factor in his execution.

=== Post-1980s ===
More recently, Prime Minister nominee Michele Pierre-Louis was rumored to be a lesbian, thus promoting public condemnation by legislators that she was immoral and thus unfit to hold public office. She was allowed to hold the post, but only after reading a public statement declaring the rumors to be false and an insult to her good character.

In 2007, the New York City-based Haitian Lesbian and Gay Alliance was created to provide social services to the Haitian LGBTQ minority as well as to campaign for their human rights.

In 2008, about a dozen Haitians took part in the nation's first gay rights demonstration.

=== 2010 earthquake ===
Fourteen Haitians were killed by the 2010 earthquake while attending a support group for gay and bisexual men.

In the weeks following the earthquake, many gay men in Haiti heard sermons on the radio and in churches, as well as talk in the streets that blamed the masisi (gay, derogative) and other "sinners" for incurring the wrath of God and causing the earthquake. One gay man reported to the International Gay and Lesbian Human Rights Commission (IGLHRC) and that a man who has sex with men (MSM) friend was beaten by an angry crowd whose members verbally abused him and accused him of being responsible for the earthquake.

When Paul Emil Ernst, the Director of the AIDS service organization Action Civique Contre le VIH (ACCV) in Port-au-Prince struggled to climb out from under the rubble of his collapsed office, he heard cheers coming from neighbors gathering outside: "Meci Jesus, prezidan an pedo ki mouri." ("Thank you Jesus, the president of the pedophiles is dead.") and "Mo an masisi!" ("Death to the masisi!").

There were also verbal and physical attacks against Vodou practitioners following the earthquake, perpetrated by those who felt that, like homosexuals, Vodouists were immoral and bore some responsibility for the country's catastrophe.

It is common knowledge in Haiti that a significant number of Vodou are masisi, and many LGBTQ believe that it was easier to be open about one's sexuality and gender expression within Vodou culture.

After the earthquake hit, gay and bisexual men reported that they had taken on a more masculine demeanor since the earthquake, altering their voice, posture, and gait – "mettre des roches sur nos epaules" ("putting rocks on our shoulders") – in order to avoid harassment both inside and outside of the camps and to reduce the chances of being denied access to emergency housing, healthcare, and/or enrollment in food-for-work programs.

In the post-earthquake context, many LGBTQ people expressed a lack of confidence in the capacity and the willingness of the police to assure protection and adherence to the rule of law when it came to protecting LGBTQ people. As a case study, a man interviewed said he was threatened and physically attacked for supposedly flirting with a man sitting across from him on a tap tap (local bus). When he found a nearby policeman, rather than explaining that he was being harassed as a result of his sexuality, he told the policeman that he had been a victim of theft because, he said, "I knew that [the police] would only help me if I told them that I had been robbed. If the police knew I was gay, they would have attacked me instead of the man who beat me."

Another gay man interviewed by the IGLHRC reported that "My brother and I were having an argument. I went to the police looking for help. When my brother told them that I was masisi (gay), they slapped me and laughed. They beat me even worse than he did."

A group of lesbian women interviewed by the IGLHRC reported that sexual violence and corrective rape were "definitely a problem" in the refugee camps after the earthquake. The rape of lesbians, gay men and transgender women in or near camps was documented. For example, a 24-year-old lesbian was brutally raped by eight men at the Champs de Mars camp.

==== Sexual Orientation and Identity ====
In June 2017, the Haitian senate launched a bill in attempts to regulate who receives a certification of good conduct. In Haiti, this is called Certificat de Bonne Vie et Mœurs. Many employers and schools require this document. It serves as a background check on the individual it is issued to. Homosexuality is listed as a crime that allows reason for denial of receiving this certificate.

By August 2017, another bill was passed by the Haitian Senate to ban gay marriage. Any individual who are involved in a gay marriage, the newly weds, and any accomplices may be punished with up to three years in prison and a fine of eight thousand dollars US.

== Summary table ==
Same-sex sexual activity legal	Yes (Since 1791)
Equal age of consent (18)	Yes (Since 1791)
Anti-discrimination laws in employment	Yes / No (Sexual orientation only)
Anti-discrimination laws in the provision of goods and services	No
Anti-discrimination laws in all other areas (incl. indirect discrimination, hate speech)	No
Same-sex marriages	No
Recognition of same-sex couples	No
Step-child adoption by same-sex couples	No
Joint adoption by same-sex couples	No
Gays and lesbians allowed to serve openly in the military	Yes (since 2017)
Right to change legal gender	No
Access to IVF for lesbians	No
Commercial surrogacy for gay male couples	No
MSMs allowed to donate blood	Yes

== See also ==
- Haitian Vodou and sexual orientation

General:

- Human rights in Haiti
- LGBT rights in the Americas
