= Hounfour =

Vodou temple

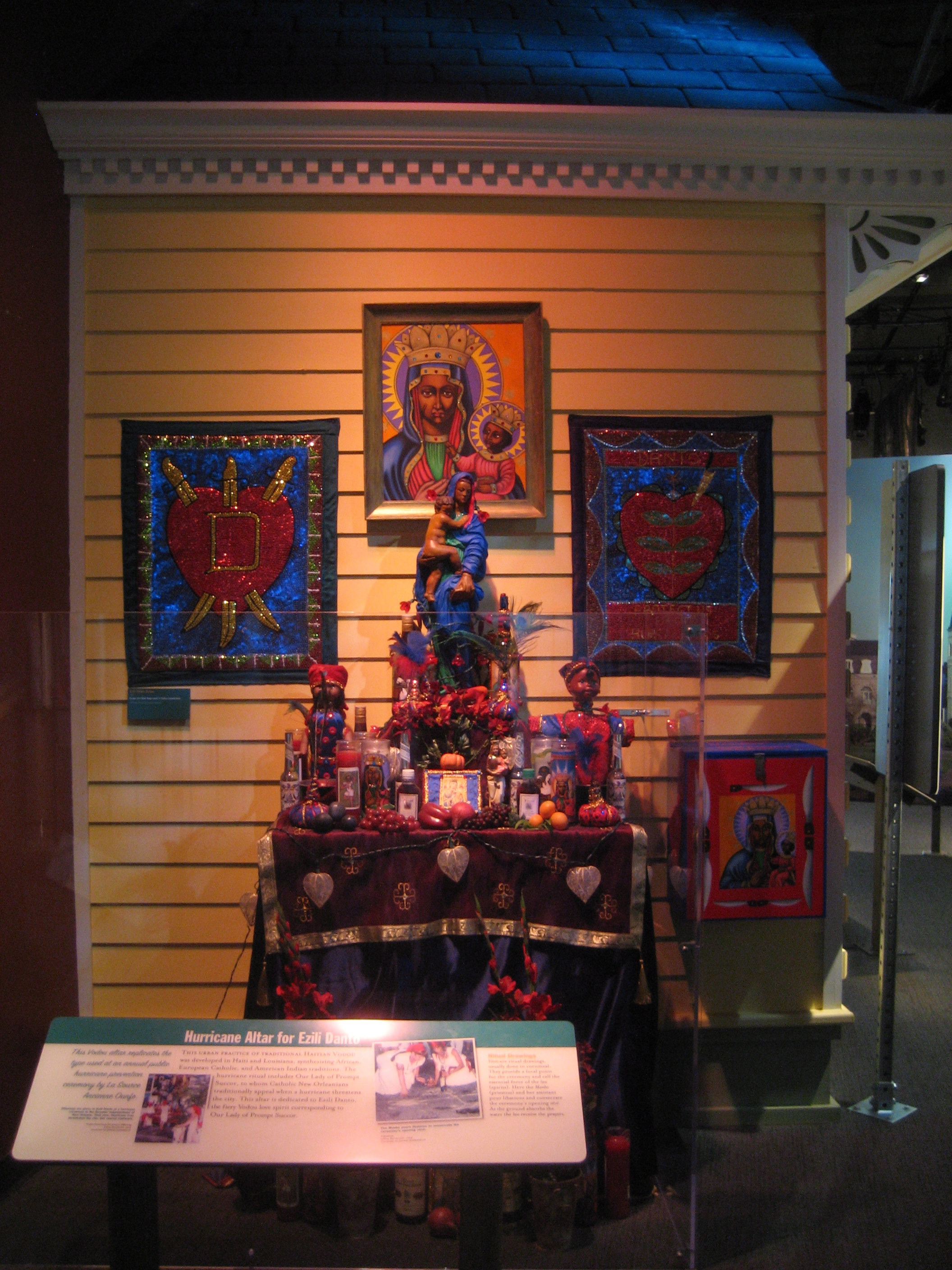
Voodoo altar, displayed at the Baton Rouge Museum in Louisiana.

A hounfour (also called oufo, hounfor, oum'phor, or houmfort) is a Vodou temple. The leader of the ceremony is a male priest called a houngan, or a female priest called a mambo. The term is believed to derive from the Fon houn for "abode of spirits."

At the centre of the temple is the potomitan, a post used to contact spirits, and a highly decorated altar. There is a feast before the ceremony, and a particular pattern (a veve) relating to the loa being worshiped is outlined on the temple floor.

Accompanied by beats from rattles and religious drums called tamboulas, dancing and chanting begins. One of the dancers is said to be possessed by the loa, entering a trance and behaving just as the loa would. An animal, normally a chicken, goat, sheep, or pig, is sacrificed and its blood is collected. This is used to sate the hunger of the loa.
