= Erin L. Durban =

American academic and LGBTQ+ activist

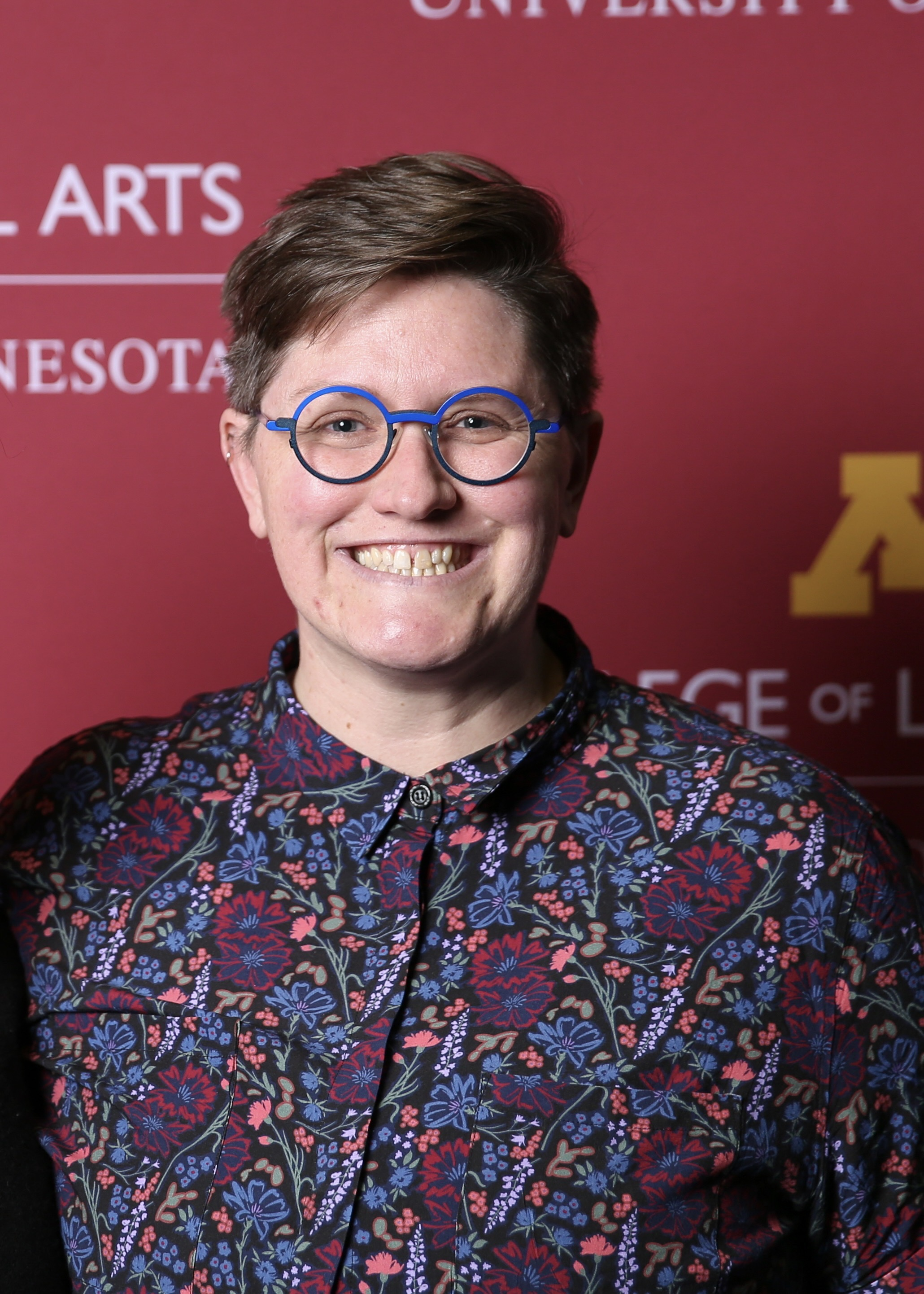
- Professor Durban at the University of Minnesota

Erin L. Durban is a professor of anthropology and critical disability studies at the University of Minnesota. They are the author of The Sexual Politics of Empire: Postcolonial Homophobia in Haiti, winner of the Lambda Literary Award in LGBT Studies and the National Women's Studies/University of Illinois Press First Book Prize. Durban's scholarship contextualizes LGBT rights in Haiti and created a foundation for the subfield of "queer Haitian studies." In anthropology, Durban's work, especially their article "Anthropology and Ableism," addresses issues of ableism and disability accessibility in ethnographic research methods. In addition to their scholarship, Durban has been an activist since the early 2000s and was recognized with the Mario Savio Young Activist Award "presented each year to a young person (or persons) with a deep commitment to human rights and social justice and a proven ability to transform this commitment into effective action."

== Education ==
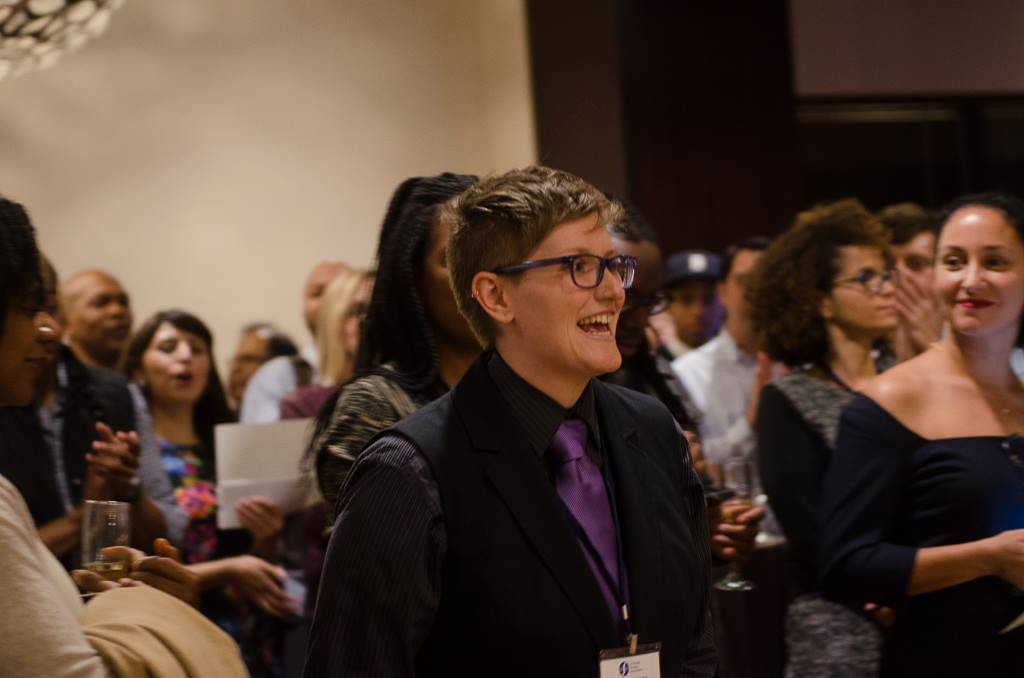
Erin L. Durban receiving the ASA Dissertation Prize

Durban received an individualized bachelor's degree in International Politics: Race, Class Gender, and Liberation from Metropolitan State University of Denver in 2006. They earned a PhD in gender and women's studies from the University of Arizona. Durban's dissertation, "Postcolonial Homophobia: United States Imperialism in Haiti and the Transnational Circulation of Anti-Gay Sexual Politics," was awarded the American Studies Association Ralph Henry Gabriel Prize for "the best doctoral dissertation in American studies, ethnic studies, or women's studies."

== Career ==
During their tenure as a doctoral student, Durban served as managing editor of the academic journal Feminist Formations (formerly the journal for the National Women's Studies Association). After completing their PhD, Durban taught women's studies, queer studies, and anthropology at Illinois State University. They have been a professor at University of Minnesota since 2017. In 2020, Durban received the prestigious McKnight Land Grant Professorship awarded to scholars with a significant impact on their fields early in their careers. From 2020 to 2023, Durban served as elected Chair of the Association for Queer Anthropology, a section of the American Anthropological Association.

== Works ==
Based on their dissertation at the University of Arizona and supplemental research as an assistant professor, Erin L. Durban's first book The Sexual Politics of Empire: Postcolonial Homophobia in Haiti explores the impacts of European colonialism and United States imperialism in shaping gender and sexuality in Haiti and its diaspora. The book provides a historical analysis of foreign intervention as well as ethnographic details about "same-sex desiring and gender creative" life and activism in Haiti from 2008 to 2016. A review in American Ethnologist notes that "as the first book-length ethnography in the subfield of queer Haitian studies, The Sexual Politics of Empire marks a foundational contribution." And in Anthropological Quarterly, the review states that "The Sexual Politics of Empire effectively gathers historical, ethnographic, and archival data to tell a compelling and moving story of postcolonial homophobia in Haiti. The book makes its primary intervention in queer postcolonial scholarship and queer anthropology by showing how racialized discourses of deviant sexualities and homophobia operated in tandem to produce imperialist outcomes for postcolonial queer subjects."

== Selected publications ==
- Durban, Erin L. 2024. "Doing It Together: A Queer Case for Cripping Ethnography" in Unsettling Queer Anthropology, edited by Margot Weiss.
- Durban, Erin L. 2022. The Sexual Politics of Empire: Postcolonial Homophobia in Haiti. University of Illinois Press.
- Durban, Erin L. 2022. “Anthropology and Ableism.” American Anthropologist 124(1): 8-20.
- Chapman, Dasha, Erin L. Durban, and Mario LaMothe, editors. "Nou Mache Ansanm (We Walk Together): Queer Haitian Performance and Affiliation." Women & Performance: a journal of feminist theory 27(2).
- Durban, Erin L. 2017. “Performing Postcolonial Homophobia: An Analysis of the 2013 Public Demonstrations Against Same-Sex Marriage in Haiti.” Women & Performance: a journal of feminist theory 27(2).
- Durban, Erin L. 2017. “Postcolonial Disablement and/as Transition: Trans* Haitian Narratives of Breaking Open and Stitching Together.” Transgender Studies Quarterly 4(2) The Issue of Blackness.
- Durban, Erin L. 2013. “The Legacy of Assotto Saint: Tracing Transnational History from the Gay Haitian Diaspora.” The Journal of Haitian Studies 19(1): 235–256.

== Honors and awards ==
Erin L. Durban was awarded the Mario Savio Young Activist Award in 2005 for social justice organizing work through the American Friends Service Committee.

Durban's first book, The Sexual Politics of Empire: Postcolonial Homophobia in Haiti, won of the Lambda Literary Award in LGBT Studies in 2024.

== Personal life ==
Durban is married to Dr. Miranda Joseph, author and the chair of the gender, women and sexuality studies department at the University of Minnesota. Durban's previous marriage ended in divorce.
