= Miranda Joseph =

American academic and author

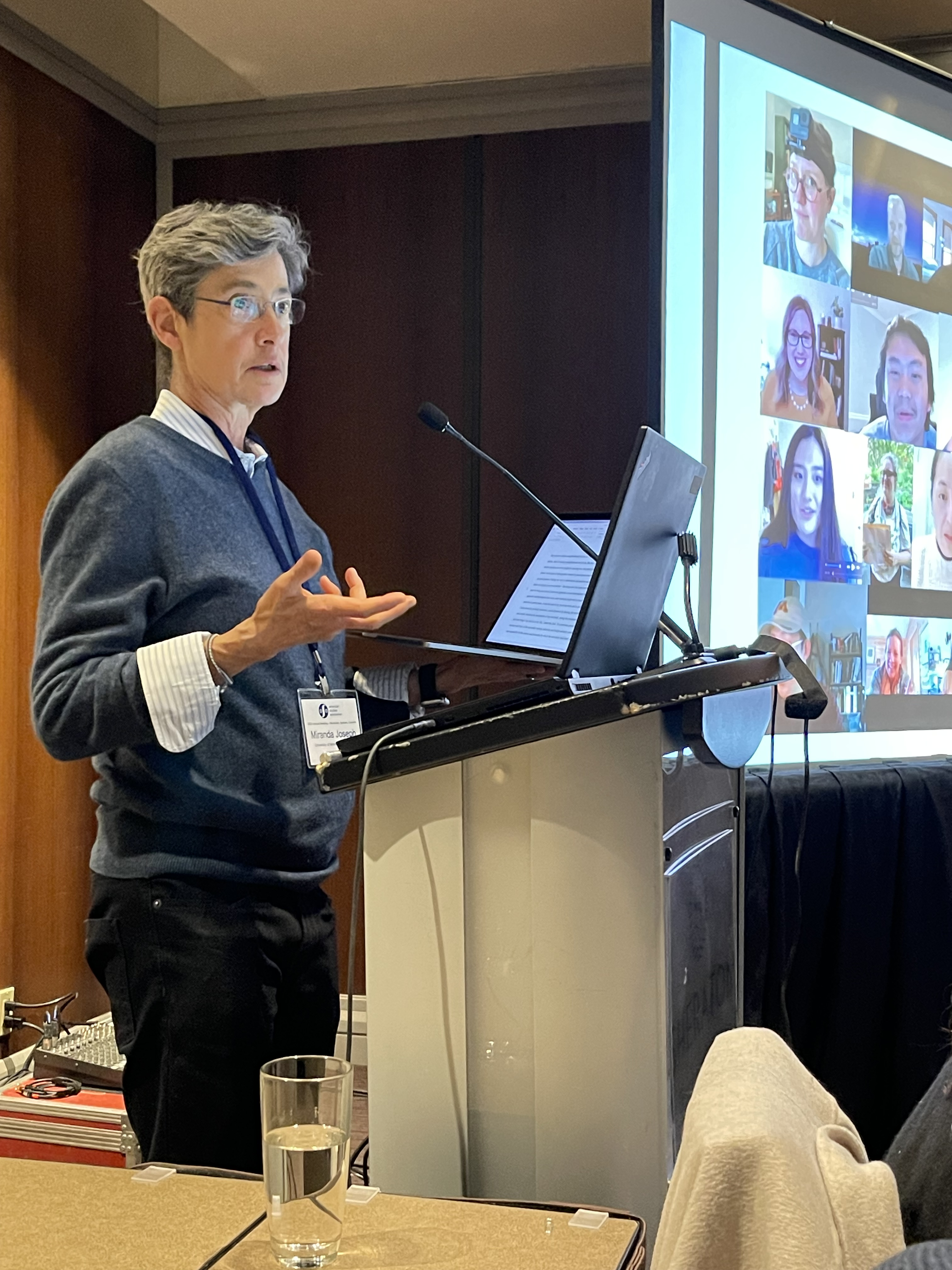
Miranda Joseph presenting research at the American Studies Association conference.

Miranda Joseph is an American academic who teaches at the University of Minnesota. She is a social theorist and author known for her work linking cultural and economic processes. Joseph has written two books on the topic, Against the Romance of Community and Debt to Society: Accounting for Life Under Capitalism.

== Education and career ==
Joseph graduated from the University of Pennsylvania and earned a doctorate in Modern Thought and Literature from Stanford University in 1995.

She started her career at the University of Arizona in 1995 as faculty in Gender & Women's Studies. She served as Director for the Committee on Lesbian, Gay, Bisexual and Transgender Studies and on the faculty executive committee once it became the Institute for LGBT Studies. As Director, Joseph led the Rockefeller-funded Sex, Race, and Globalization (SRG) Project from 1999 to 2005 to explore “the imbrication of sexuality, gender, and race with economic, political, and information processes across local, regional, national, and transnational scales…[and] to describe and explain the links between exploitative economic practices and structures of sexual, gendered, and racial inequality.” During her tenure at University of Arizona, Joseph served as Director of Graduate Studies and Chair of Gender & Women's Studies and chaired the Strategic and Budget Advisory Committee.

Joseph became the Winton Chair in the Liberal Arts at University of Minnesota in 2016 and subsequently chaired the Department of Gender, Women & Sexuality Studies from 2017 to 2020. As of 2024, she is a professor of Gender, Women & Sexuality Studies at the University of Minnesota and Chair of the Department of American Studies.

== Works ==
In her books, Joseph theorizes the relationship between cultural and economic processes. Based on her dissertation at Stanford, Joseph's first book Against the Romance of Community explores the supplementary relationship of "community" with capitalism. The book argues that while "community" is invoked as a positive relationship that supposedly exists outside of capitalism, that it in fact is deeply imbricated with capitalism. The book draws on ethnographic research with gay and lesbian theater company Theater Rhinoceros in San Francisco. Her second book, Debt to Society: Accounting for Life Under Capitalism, theorizes accounting practices as they are used to reproduce or transform neoliberal capitalism.

Joseph has produced a strand of scholarship considering key issues in interdisciplinary departments and fields, particularly women's studies, queer studies, and American studies. This work as well as her projects about university property and finance contributes to critical university studies.

== Selected publications ==
- Joseph, Miranda. "The Performance of Production and Consumption." Social Text 54 (1998): 25-61.
- Joseph, Miranda. Against the Romance of Community. University of Minnesota Press, 2002.
- Joseph, Miranda, and Sandra K. Soto. "Neoliberalism and the Battle over Ethnic Studies in Arizona." Thought and Action: The NEA Higher Education Journal (2010): 45-56.
- Joseph, Miranda. "Gender, Entrepreneurial Subjectivity, and Pathologies of Personal Finance." Social Politics 20.2 (2013): 242-273.
- Joseph, Miranda. Debt to Society: Accounting for Life under Capitalism. University of Minnesota Press, 2014.
- Durban, Erin L., and Miranda Joseph. "Reimagining Ethnographic Research for Collective Access through (Crip) Collaboration." In The Disabled Anthropologist, pp. 96–116. Routledge, 2025.

== Honors and awards ==
An endowed lecture at the University of Arizona in her name "honors the scholarly and institution-building work of Miranda Joseph, a former UA [Gender and Women's Studies] Professor whose leadership efforts contributed to the creation of the LGBTQ+ Institute."

== Personal life ==
Joseph is married to Professor Erin L. Durban. As of 2017, the couple has lived with their kid Fenniver in the University Grove faculty neighborhood at the University of Minnesota where they have conducted ethnographic and archival research about histories of racism and racial exclusion.
