= Haitian Vodou and homosexuality =

Homosexuality in Haitian Vodou is religiously acceptable and homosexuals are allowed to participate in all religious activities. However, in West African countries with major conservative Christian and Islamic views on LGBTQ people, the attitudes towards them may be less tolerant if not openly hostile and these influences are reflected in African diaspora religions following Atlantic slave trade which includes Haitian Vodou.

Haitian Vodou itself has remained open to people of all sexual orientations. It is common knowledge in Haiti that a significant number of Haitian Vodou are gay. Many LGBT people in Haiti believe that it is easier to be open about one's sexuality and gender expression within Vodou culture, in the face of open hostility by mainstream Haitian society.

== Haitian views of homosexuality ==
Vodou is an ancestral religion, and is viewed by some Western anthropologists as an ecstatic religion. It is not a fertility-based religion (see Fertility rites). This means that the majority of its members are not required by any religious law to reproduce, and homosexuals are not pressured to do so. Haitian Vodou views sexual orientation as a part of the way God makes a person; homosexuals are free to pursue members of the same sex just as heterosexuals are free to pursue members of the opposite sex.

In Haitian Vodou, male homosexuals are seen as under the protection of the Erzulie Freda, the loa of love and beauty. She is very feminine, allowing gay men to exhibit stereotypical traits during religious ceremonies. The documentary "Des hommes et dieux" presents interviews with several people who feel Erzulie Freda made them gay. Erzulie Dantor is seen as the patron of lesbians, although she is herself bisexual having a number of children and two husbands, Simbi Makaya and Ti Jean Petwo, though she is said to prefer the company of women.

== Opposing views in non-Haitian based Vodou ==
There are, however, views among other Vodou practitioners that overt identification as homosexuals has no place within the tradition. The leader of Le Peristyle Haitian Sanctuary in Philadelphia, Pennsylvania, asserts that there is no connection between the loa and gender complexity, and states that "...your gender identification is your business. But you cannot evoke God to satisfy your sexual desires. We have suffered this kind of abuse of African-based religions long enough. It is time for it to stop."

Similarly, the website for Mami Wata West African Diaspora Vodoun, based in the southern United States, notes that elders in the Vodoun religion are generally against initiating homosexuals. The Mami Wata organization itself followed this exclusionary practice until recently, but now welcomes all practitioners.

== Relationship between loa and gender identity ==
During Haitian Vodou ceremonies, the houngans (priests), mambos (priestesses), and hounsis (initiates) dance around a potomitan until one of them becomes possessed by one of the lwa. A person can be possessed by any lwa, regardless of whether they are the same gender or not. During possession, the possessed dancer will begin to behave like the lwa they are possessed by, regardless of gender.

Reverend Severina KM Singh, a New Orleans Voodoo priestess explains,

I have gay friends who practice and I can personally attest to the closeness of the loa to them. I have witnessed wonderful and powerful rituals which they led. The intent in your heart matters more than your sexual orientation. I read for very many gay people and make offerings for them without any qualms at all. Voodooist believe in the transmigration of the soul. That means my soul could have been in a black male body at one time and an oriental female body at another time, not to mention the millions of lives spent in lower life forms. Some of them probably quite asexual or bisexual or transsexual!

== Beliefs ==
A large number of spirits or deities (lwa) exist in Haitian and Louisiana Voodoo. These lwa may be regarded as families of individuals or as a singular entity with distinct aspects, with links to particular areas of life.

Some lwa have particular links with magic, ancestor worship or death such as the Gede and Barons. A number of these are further particularly associated with transness or same-sex interactions. These include Ghede Nibo, a spirit caring for those who die young. He is sometimes depicted as an effeminate drag queen and inspires those he inhabits to lascivious sexuality of all kinds, especially transgender or lesbian behaviour in women.

Gede Nibo's parents are Baron Samedi and Maman Brigitte; Baron Samedi is the leader of the Gede and Barons and is depicted as bisexual dandy or occasionally cross-dressing, wearing a top-hat and frock coat along with a woman's skirt and shoes. Samedi has a tendency toward "lascivious movements" that cross gender boundaries and also imply a lust for anal sex.

Other barons displaying gay behaviour are Baron Lundy and Baron Limba, who are lovers and teach a type of homoerotic nude wrestling at their school, believed to increase magical potency. Baron Oua Oua, who often manifests with a childlike aspect, has been called the baron "most closely linked to homosexuality" by Vodou practitioners.

Another lwa, Erzulie, is associated with love, sensuality and beauty. Erzulie can manifest aspects that are LGBT-related, including transgender or amazonian traits, in addition to traditionally feminine guises. When inhabiting men, these aspects can result in transgender or homoerotic behaviour, whereas they may result in lesbianism or anti-male sentiment in women. Erzulie Freda is seen as the protector of gay men, and Erzulie Dantor is associated with lesbians.

== See also ==
- Bomoh
- Core Shamanism
- Hoodoo
- Kumina
- LGBT rights in Haiti
- Louisiana Voodoo
- Mana
- Obeah
- Quimbanda
- Religion and homosexuality
- Religion and sexuality
- Sangoma
- Santería
- Shaman
- Umbanda

== Sources ==
- Conner, Randy P.; David Hatfield Sparks; Mariya Sparks (1998). Cassell's Encyclopedia of Queer Myth, Symbol and Spirit. UK: Cassell. ISBN 0-304-70423-7.
- Essays: GLBT People in Vodou
