= Charlot Jeudy =

Haitian activist involved in the emergence of LGBT rights Haiti

- Born: January 1, 1984; Port-au-Prince, Haiti
- Died: November 25, 2019 (aged 35); Port-au-Prince, Haiti
- Organisation: Kouraj

Charlot Jeudy (January 1, 1984 – November 25, 2019) was a Haitian activist who was involved in the emergence of an LGBT rights movement in Haiti.

He was a leading figure in the M community (Masisi, Madivin, Monkonpè, Makomè, Mix) in Haiti, as well as a human rights activist with his involvement in Kouraj. Charlot Jeudy was also a collaborator of the Massimadi Festival, the United Nations Mission for Justice Support in Haiti and Equitas.

== Biography ==
=== Activism ===
Beginning in 2009, Charlot Jeudy struggled with his friends to demonstrate the importance of an organizational structure that promoted LGBT rights in Haiti, as Jeudy had been the victim of several acts of discrimination. The idea of AMIAMI originated with the primary goal of creating cultural events in the LGBT community. After 2 years, in December 2011, AMIAMI became KOURAJ, which incorporated other priorities such as the fight against homophobia and transphobia within Haitian society. Jeudy was bold enough to make a first public statement in January 2012 on Haiti's national radio station in which he denounced Christians who advocated that it was "sins like homosexuality that were responsible for the January 12 earthquake." Despite pressure to stay silent, Jeudy participated in another interview, this time on television, during which he publicly stated that he was the president of KOURAJ, an organization defending the homosexual community. With the help of external partners, the first International Day Against Homophobia and Transphobia was held in Haiti on May 17, 2012, to raise awareness among the Haitian population of the need to respect sexual orientation and gender identity. In 2013, KOURAJ was led by a team of 7 people, with Jeudy as president, and had 70 active members.

In an interview in 2016, Charlot Jeudy testified to the difficulty of being gay in Haiti on Radio-Canada.

In the fall of 2016, Charlot Jeudy planned to launch the first Haitian edition of the Massimadi Festival in Port-au-Prince. Massimadi Haiti was intended as an opportunity to present for the first time the realities of LGBTQ communities through films, exhibitions, and discussions. It was based on a concept developed in 2009 by the Montreal-based organization Arc-en-ciel d'Afrique. Instead, the organisers had to cancel all planned events, especially because of death threats to which some had been subjected and because of national attention and international media coverage of the subject in the news.

On August 3, 2018, the United Nations Mission for Justice Support in Haiti unveiled a community-based intervention project led by LGBTI people. Its principle is to fight homophobia by promoting a culture of peace and positive values such as law, tolerance, equality, non-discrimination, respect for human life choices and human security. To this end, the MINUJUSTH Human Rights Section found a partner in the Kouraj association and its President Charlot Jeudy.

=== Death and reactions ===
On November 25, 2019, Charlot Jeudy was found dead at his home in Vivy Michel in the town of Pétion-Ville. According to initial reports, Jeudy died of poisoning or strangulation. The full circumstances of his death have yet to be clarified.

The French and American embassies condemned the strange circumstances of his death and asked for an investigation.
