= Potomitan =

Essential structural feature of the hounfour (temple) in Haitian vodou

The potomitan (also spelled poteau-mitan, poto mitan, poto-mitan: Haitian Creole: "central pole" - from the French: poteau, "post", and mitan, an archaism for "half") is an essential structural feature of the hounfour (temple) in Haitian vodou. Occupying the central position in the peristyle (sacred space at the centre of the hounfour / oufo), the potomitan takes the form of a decorated wooden post (occasionally a living tree) by means of which, it is believed, the loa descend to Earth to inhabit, for a time, the bodies of the faithful through spirit possession.

The structure consists usually of the whole trunk of a palm tree, being fixed to the ground by a masonry pedestal commonly known as a socle and attached at the top to the roof of the temple. A potomitan is often painted with designs in bright colours, featuring usually the motif of two intertwined serpents, symbolizing the primordial male and female divine couple Damballa and Ayida Weddo who, according to the cosmogony of the Haitian religion, support the sky, preventing it from crumbling and falling to Earth. Taken its entirety, however, the ritual post represents the deity Papa Legba, the gatekeeper or messenger of the loa, without whose intercession communication with the realm of the divine would be impossible.

Sacrifices are carried out regularly to sanctify the structure and honour the deity, either at the foot of the potomitan itself or at the base of the socle - most notably prior to Vodou ceremonies proper - in order to keep it a fit conduit for the transmission of the divine powers. The potomitan constitutes a ritual representation, in a specifically Haitian context, of the axis mundi and, more specifically the world tree.
