= Massimadi Festival =

LGBTQ film festival in Quebec, Canada

The Massimadi Festival is an annual arts and cultural festival in Montreal, Quebec, which centres on LGBTQ culture from Africa and the African diaspora. Launched in 2009 by activist Laurent Lafontant, the event stages a program of artistic exhibitions, film screenings and panel discussions on Black LGBTQ communities and topics.

In 2021, the organization also launched Massimadi en rue, a street performance event staged separately from the festival.

An event, created in collaboration with Haitian LGBTQ activist Charlot Jeudy, was slated to launch in Port-au-Prince in 2016, but was cancelled after threats of violence from anti-gay protestors.

The event is a qualifying festival for the Canadian Screen Awards.
