= Iconostasis of the Cathedral of Hajdúdorog =

Largest Greek Catholic icon screen in Hungary

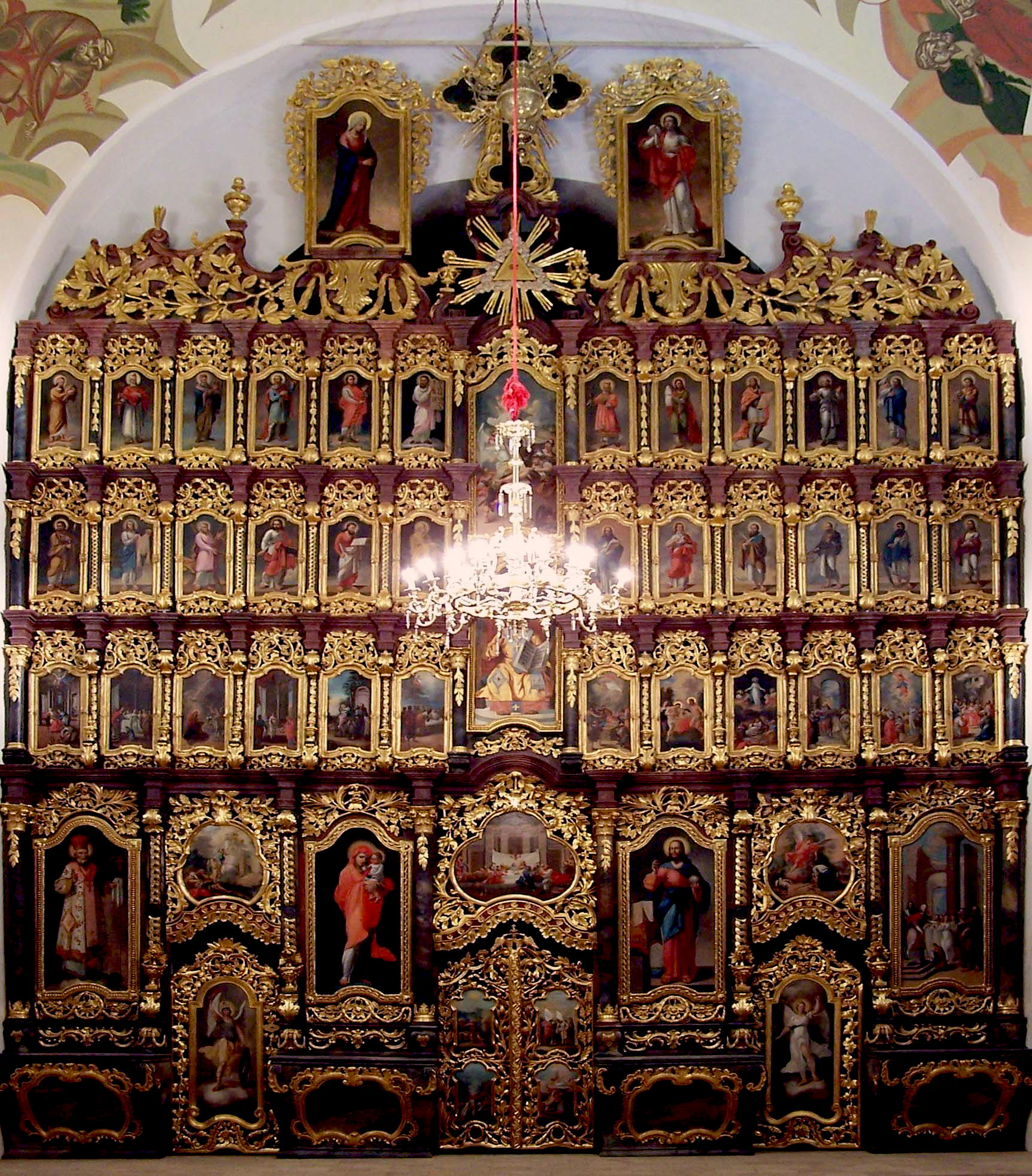
The iconostasis of the cathedral

The iconostasis of the Cathedral of Hajdúdorog is the largest Greek Catholic icon screen in Hungary. It is 11 m (36 ft.) tall and 7 m (23 ft.) wide, holding 54 icons on five tiers. Creating such a monumental work of art requires a number of different craftsmen. Miklós Jankovits was hired by the Greek Catholic parish of Hajdúdorog in 1799 to carve the wooden framework, including the doors and the icon frames of the iconostasis. Mátyás Hittner and János Szűts could only start the painting and gilding works in 1808. The last icon was completed in 1816.

The icons were painted clearly in Western style, quite unusual in Eastern rite churches. Instead of the traditional Byzantine iconographic depiction, the painters used the deep, rich colors, the intense light and dark shadows, and the eventful and realistic portrayal of late Baroque painting. The exact reason for turning towards the Western style is still disputed. However, Greek Catholicism by nature is closer to the Latin Rite, especially in 19th-century Hungary, where most of the population was Latin Catholic. Thus Western art and probably the Catholic rulers of the country, the Habsburgs, influenced the painters and the parish too.

While the structure of the iconostasis is based on Slavic tradition, it also displays a number of differences. Given Hungary's Latin Catholic majority, the artists who decorated Eastern rite churches usually either copied the style of a church in an Orthodox country or came from an Orthodox country themselves. Jankovits had Greek ancestors, but his icon screens were considered the only works with a style typical of Hungary. He combined several different styles. Rich, gilded ornaments, Zopf shapes of rose heads, tulips and Acanthus leaves characterize his work. Jankovits usually carved figures of animals on the top of the Royal Doors, clearly marking his style. In Hajdúdorog he added two ravens.
Another important difference is that the icons do not start from the floor level. Altarpieces, that were not part of the original structure, stand between the holy doors instead. And the lifelike portraits typical of Western style are seldom found on Eastern icon screens.

The iconostasis frames were slightly altered before the icons were completed. A local craftsman probably added the altarpieces between the doors. The icon screen underwent four renovations. The first affected only the so-called "Sovereign tier" in 1868. A few years later, in the 1870s the entire work was renovated by György Révész and his team. In the years preceding the 1938 34th Eucharistic Congress in Budapest, the Catholic Church undertook renovation work in churches throughout the country. In 1937 the iconostasis of Hajdúdorog was re-painted in a rather low artistic quality. Györgyi Károlyi and Csongor Bedő completed the latest renovation in 2002, restoring the original colors and compositions as far as they possibly could.

== History of the iconostasis ==
The latest restoration works commenced in 2000 on the entire iconostasis. At the same time, in cooperation with the restorers, a thorough investigation was initiated in ecclesiastical and diocesan archives and libraries to settle some of the controversial details relating to the history of the icon screen. In 1799, the parish commissioned the most notable master of the period, Miklós Jankovits, to carve the iconostasis frames. Jankovits who had Greek ancestors ran a highly ranked religious art workshop in Eger. He undertook the job for 2,000 Rhenish guilders, promising to complete the work within two years. Certain sources add that a local wood-carver, László Lengyel, assisted Jankovits with his work. In 1808, following the erection of the carved frameworks of the iconostasis, Mátyás Hittner and János Szűts started marbling and gilding the frames, and painting the icons themselves. Hittner and Szűts, both from the town of Miskolc, planned the work over a period of three years and estimated the cost would reach 12,000 guilders. However, the costs soon started to increase. The parish and the town blamed the painters for raising the prices. In response, Hittner and Szűts first complained about the increase in the price of the gold before blaming each other for negligent work. The parish withheld payment until a final price was agreed. Years passed without a solution, leading Hittner to leave Hajdúdorog and look for another job. The town and the parish finally made an agreement with Szűts, who had by then moved with his family from Miskolc to Hajdúdorog. He finished the last icons in 1816 but refused to hand over the last three—the icons of the Calvary scene—over to the church, until he was paid. The restorers tried to separate Hittner's icons from the ones Szűts painted, but it proved to be impossible. The icons of the lower tiers can be associated with Hittner, and the upper ones are probably Szűts' work.

The Synod of Zamość, 1720, tried to move the Eastern churches united with Rome closer to the Latin Rite. The decisions of the synod forbade a number of Eastern traditions, including the erection of an iconostasis in Greek Catholic churches. Smaller altarpieces were suggested instead. Although the rule remained in force only for eight years, it influenced the structure of the icon screen in Hajdúdorog. According to Byzantine traditions, icons cover the iconostasis from the floor up to the top. The lowest row usually depicts scenes from the Old Testament. In Hajdúdorog this row was replaced by ornamental altar tables between the Royal Doors. The recent restoration revealed that these small tables might not have been part of the Jankovits' original design. Their static, conservative ornaments and style differ from the rest of the carved works. The tables, however, were added before Hittner and Szűts started to work with the original coloring.

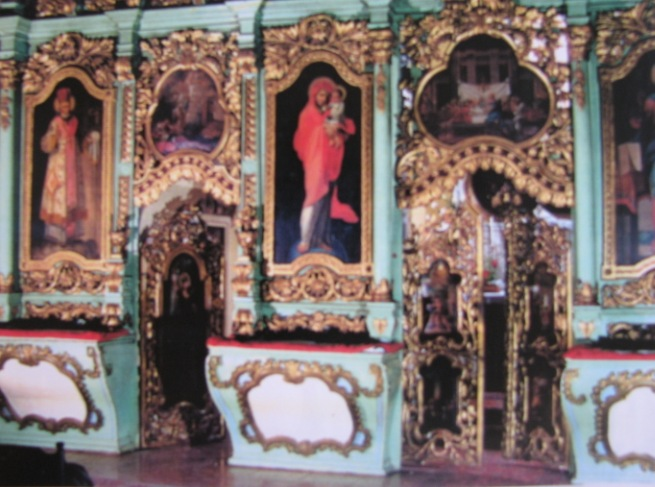
The iconostasis after the 1937 renovations

The iconostasis underwent its first renovation when the church building was extended in 1868. According to the restorers' report, only the icons of the first tier and the holy doors were repainted at the time. The heavier use of this tier and the doors might have influenced the repainting but during the renovation signs of fire damage were also discovered. The first restoration therefore probably aimed to conceal the damage. A few years later, in the mid 1870s the entire iconostasis was renovated. After the lateral aisles were added to the church, the parish decided to reshape the interior of the building. For this purpose they had to dismount the icons from the frame. The icons and their framework were renewed under the supervision of György Révész. Gyula Petrovics, a painter, and Károly Müller, a gilder, worked in his restoration team. They did not change the composition of the icons or paint them over. Minor modifications were found only on some of the images of the first, so-called Feasts tier. Révész's team worked with oil paint which was covered by a layer of varnish. The varnish first turned yellow, and later giving the original colors a darker, matte appearance. The framework of the iconostasis was marbleized. The coloring of the molding and the fundamental elements of the wooden frame resembled gray marble, while the pilasters and the columns were painted to resemble blue marble. This pattern was also adopted for the rest of the church's furniture, except for the red-ocher altar table.

On completing their renovation work, the restorers returned the icons to the Feasts tier but did not respect the Biblical chronology, with the result that they were sequenced in the wrong order. The error remained for 130 years until the icons were once again removed from the framework. The left side of the Feasts tier highlights six scenes from the life of Mary. Révész's team put the icon of the Flight into Egypt in the first position, and immediately after the scene of the Death of Mary. The next picture depicted the Annunciation, and only then came the icon of the Birth of Mary. The tier was ended with scenes of the Visitation and the Presentation of Mary. On the right side of the Feasts tier, concentrating on Jesus' life, only two scenes were transposed. The icons of the Pentecost and the Triumphal entry into Jerusalem switched places after the 19th-century renovation work. Today the icons are once again in the correct chronological sequence. The mistaken order of the Feast icons was corrected in 2002. The ecclesiastical records do not reveal the reason for the mistake. The cathedral's priests might have been absent or Révész might not have been aware of the Greek Catholic traditions. He might not even have been present when the icons were returned to their frames.

Almost 60 years later, in 1937, the iconostasis was renovated again although but the re-painting work was considered to be of really low artistic quality. This time the icons were not removed from the frame, and only a thick layer of varnish was applied to them. This layer made the icons lose their original colors and become even darker. The wooden structure of the iconostasis was painted with light green oil paint.

After the Second World War, in the years of communism, the iconostasis along with the cathedral was seriously neglected. In 1989 chemical treatment with Xylamon was used to kill the woodworm destroying the wooden structure and ornaments.

The iconostasis of Hajdúdorog obtained its current look and condition during the latest restoration between 2000 and 2002. The aim of the two restorers, Györgyi Károlyi and Csongor Bedő, was to restore the original colors and compositions of the 200-year-old work of art. After removing the icons from the frames, the restorers started the preservation works on the wooden structure with a 5-10% solution of paraloid B-72. The broken or missing elements of the carved ornaments were replaced. Károlyi and Bedő revealed the original colors of the wooden elements, they marbleized the frames and the pilasters, gilded the ornaments and removed unauthentic additions. The vivid colors and Baroque compositions of the icons were also restored.

== Wooden structure and ornaments ==
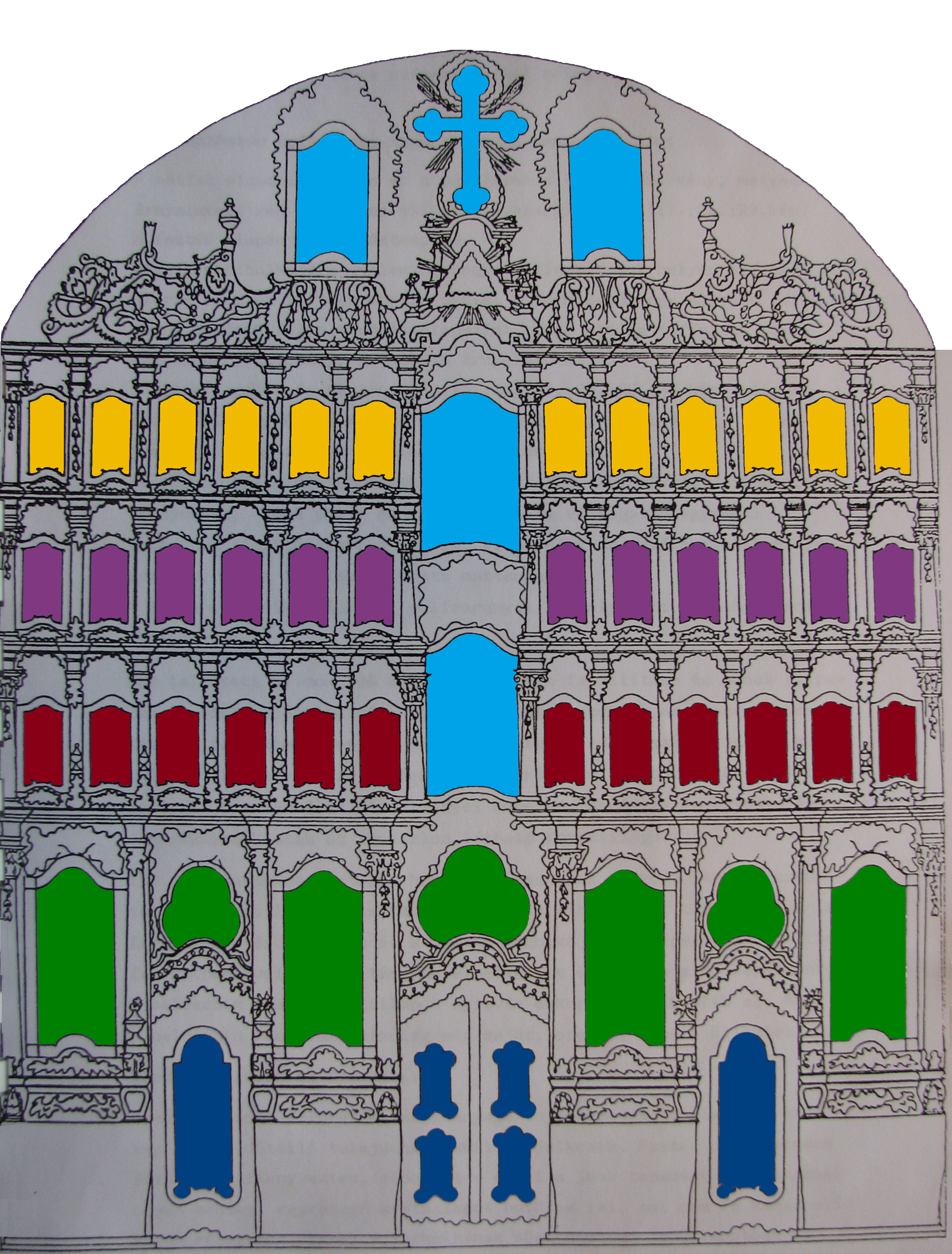
Tiers of the iconostasis of Hajdúdorog: 1. Dark Blue – icons of the three doors 2. Green – images of the bottom tier, the so-called Sovereign 3. Red – the Feasts tier 4. Purple – the Apostles tier 5. Yellow – the Prophets tier 6. Light blue – the Calvary scene, and 2 icons from the midsection of the iconostasis (resembling to the Deesis)

The majority of Hungary's population is Catholic or belongs to a Protestant congregation. Eastern Orthodox traditions were therefore not very well established and most of the Hungarian iconostases bear the characteristics of an Orthodox country's artistic style. Jankovits, on the other hand, is the only iconostasis carving master who had a genuine, Hungarian technique. He mixed three different styles, all of which can be seen on the iconostasis of Hajdúdorog:

1. Late Baroque shapes the dynamics of Jankovits' forms and ornaments
2. Rococo - or Zopf style dominates the rich, jocular and light-hearted decoration of the icon frames, the lace-like holy doors and gilded ornaments
3. Neo-Classicism determines the grandiose structure of the iconostasis: pillars, pilasters and antique capitals emphasize the Neo-Classical appearance

In Jankovits' iconostasis, the three different styles are harmoniously combined. The wooden carvings do not drive the focus away from the icons, even though the ornaments are really characteristic and determining. Greek Catholic iconostases in the Carpathian Basin usually have two or three tiers. The icon screen in Hajdúdorog has five tiers in accordance with Orthodox traditions. This makes it one of the largest Greek Catholic iconostases in the region.
The design of the iconostasis is similar to the Greek Orthodox iconostasis on Petőfi Square, Budapest. The supportive structure of the icon screen consists of robust, wooden beams 12 cm (4.7 in) wide. Vertically there are four beams, while horizontally a total of six hold the structure together. This massive framework keeps the iconostasis in a plane. Jankovits tried to break the monotony by projecting the columns and pilasters out from the iconostasis. He used tiered molding, a typical Baroque element, at the foot and capital of each pilaster and column to elevate them. The five tiers are divided with red marbleized moldings. Corinthian columns, lesenes, pilasters and corbels provide the vertical partition of the icon screen. These elements are marbleized with dark, grayish blue color.

The rich, gilded ornaments of the iconostasis are Jankovits' real style-marks. He worked with lime wood, and carved his decorative elements in two artistic styles: Zopf style appears in vivid plant motifs; and Classicism is represented by geometrical patterns, like the ribbons on pilasters or the carved tassels on the doors. The foliage usually has additional significance in ecclesiastical art. Acanthus leaves, the most common motifs on the iconostasis, symbolize heaven and the eternal life. Olive plays an important role in Biblical stories and it has many religious aspects too. There are two large olive branches under the Calvary scene, on the top of the icon screen. It represents peace in the first place, but in the Old Testament it stands for blessing, wisdom, trust, faith in God, and grace of God too, in the story of Noah. The olive is the tree of life in Paradise, and it also refers to the healing power of the Blessed Virgin Mary, especially in Eastern rites where Mary's veneration plays an important role. Grape motifs decorate the icon frames and the holy doors. The Bible contains many examples of the symbolical meaning of vines and grapes. They can symbolize peace and well-being, and might refer to Israel, but in most cases the vine is a symbol of Jesus, its fruits representing the Apostles. Following the same symbolism, the vine can also refer to Mary, whose fruit is Jesus. The most common flower of the carved festoons is the rose, which is the symbol of Mary in Christian art. Tulips, the flower of the virginity and purity, appear in the festoons as well beside the rose heads.

The structure of the three central tiers (Feasts tier, Apostles tier and Prophets tier) is similar. Their ornaments differ only in some minor details. The most conspicuous difference is the decoration of the pilasters. On the Feasts tier they are decorated with a twisted ribbon, in the row of the Apostles with two twisting ribbons that cross each other, and finally the Prophets tier is ornamented with a laurel chain topped by a rose head. The ornaments of the small altar tables between the holy doors are somewhat different from Jankovits' vivid forms. Instead of the twisting and turning plant motifs these tables are decorated with simple cartouches.
Two gilding techniques were applied on the carved ornaments of the icon screen: burnished and matte gilding. Both methods contain about 18–60% dissolved gold. In the burnished technique the surface is polished, after the gilding is dry. This method results a glossier, more emphasized surface. Among others the stems of the plants, the veins of the leaves, the flower heads and the plane surfaces of the icon frames were gilt with burnished gilding. Matte gilding was applied for the surface of the leaves and generally the deeper parts of the carved ornaments.

== Icons and tiers ==
The 54 icons of the iconostasis were painted by Hittner and Szűts with egg tempera on arched wooden board. The painters followed the concepts of late Baroque and the compositions of Western icon painting. Besides Baroque, there are also some signs of late Mannerism with the icons' light and radiant colors, and busy scenes. Today all the paintings of the iconostasis have been restored close to their original state, thanks to the latest renovation completed in 2002.

The placement of the icons on the iconostasis is governed by a number of guidelines and traditions. The rules can vary by region and period, but yet there is little room for major differences. The iconostasis of Hajdúdorog has five tiers reflecting the Slavic traditions of the era (Hajdúdorog at that time was part of the Greek Catholic Eparchy of Munkács): the Sovereign tier, the Feasts tier, the Apostles tier, the Prophets tier and the Calvary scene on the top.
The most strictly regulated part of the iconostases is the lowest tier, the so-called Sovereign. It includes the three doors: the Royal Doors in the middle, and the so-called "Deacons' Doors" on the northern and southern parts. The Deacons' Doors are usually used by the deacons and the altar servers during the holy service. In Hajdúdorog the doors are decorated with images of archangels, following the traditions. The icon of Archangel Michael is on the northern door. He holds a flaming sword in his hand, protecting the sanctuary of the cathedral. On the southern door Gabriel is depicted. He holds a white lily in his right hand, symbolizing Mary's purity in the Annunciation.
The Royal Doors or "Beautiful Gates" are definitely among the most emphasized parts of the iconostasis, as they lead directly to the main altar in the sanctuary. Its two wings are opened only during services and only ordained priests are allowed to cross it. The holy doors in Hajdúdorog are typical of Jankovits' works. On the iconostases he created, the holy doors have rich ornaments and a carved animal figure on top of each. In the town of Eger, Jankovits added a double-headed eagle to the top of the Royal Doors, in Budapest two doves decorate the gates, and in Hajdúdorog it is two ravens. The birds are holding an episcopal crown with a Greek cross on it. Ravens have multiple meanings in Christian art. The black bird symbolizes darkness and the underworld leading to the world of the dead. Alternatively it appears many times in the Bible as God's bird. It disappointed Noah, but ravens fed many saints, like Elijah, Benedict of Nursia or Paul of Thebes on God's demand.
There are four icons on the Royal Doors, each depicting a sacrificial scene from the Old Testament. The top icon on the left wing depicts the scene of Cain slaying Abel. Noah's sacrifice is below this image. The Meeting of Abram and Melchizedek is depicted in the top icon on the right wing, and the fourth picture shows the scene of binding Isaac.

Doors of the iconostasis
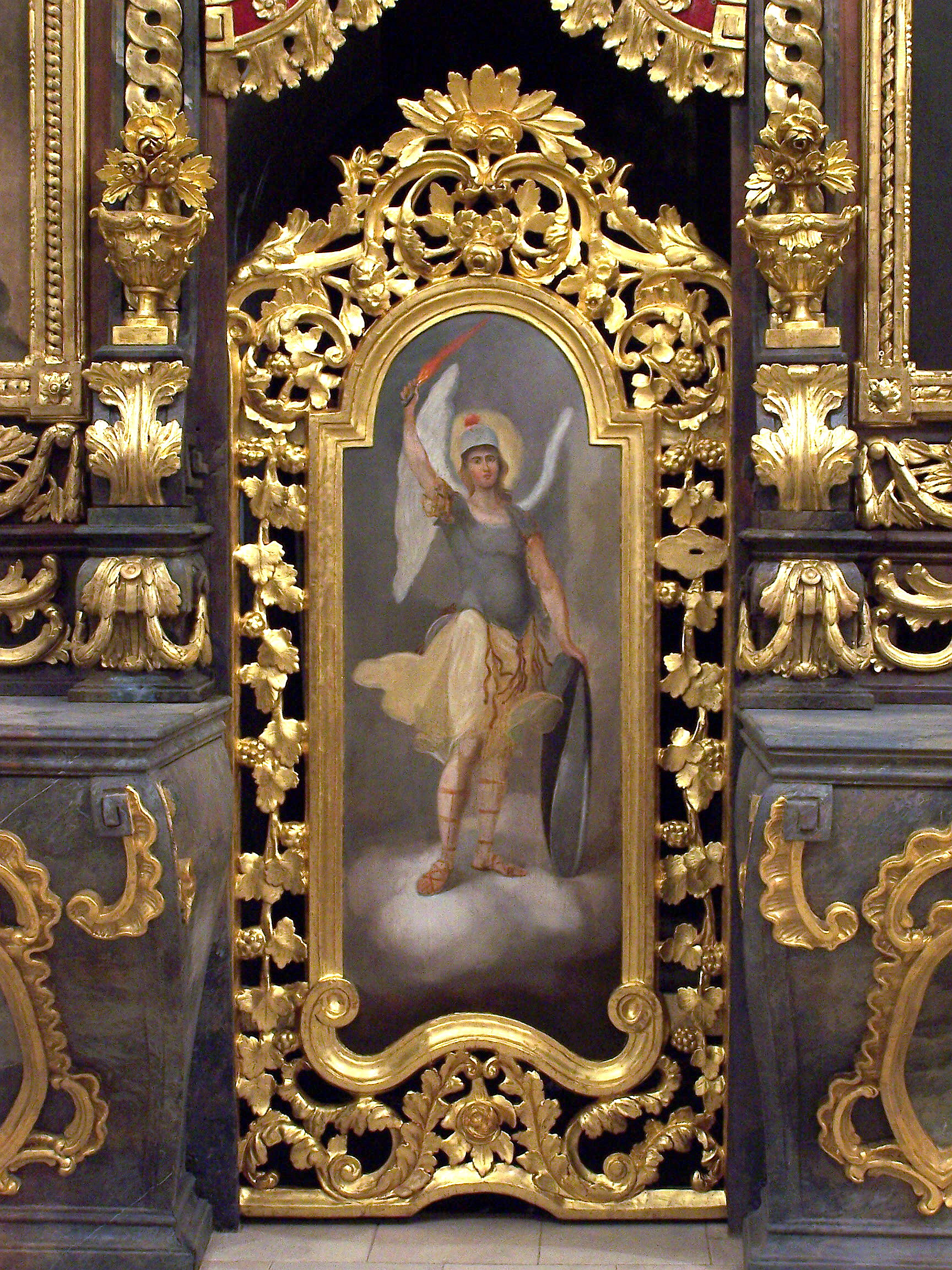
Michael Archangel

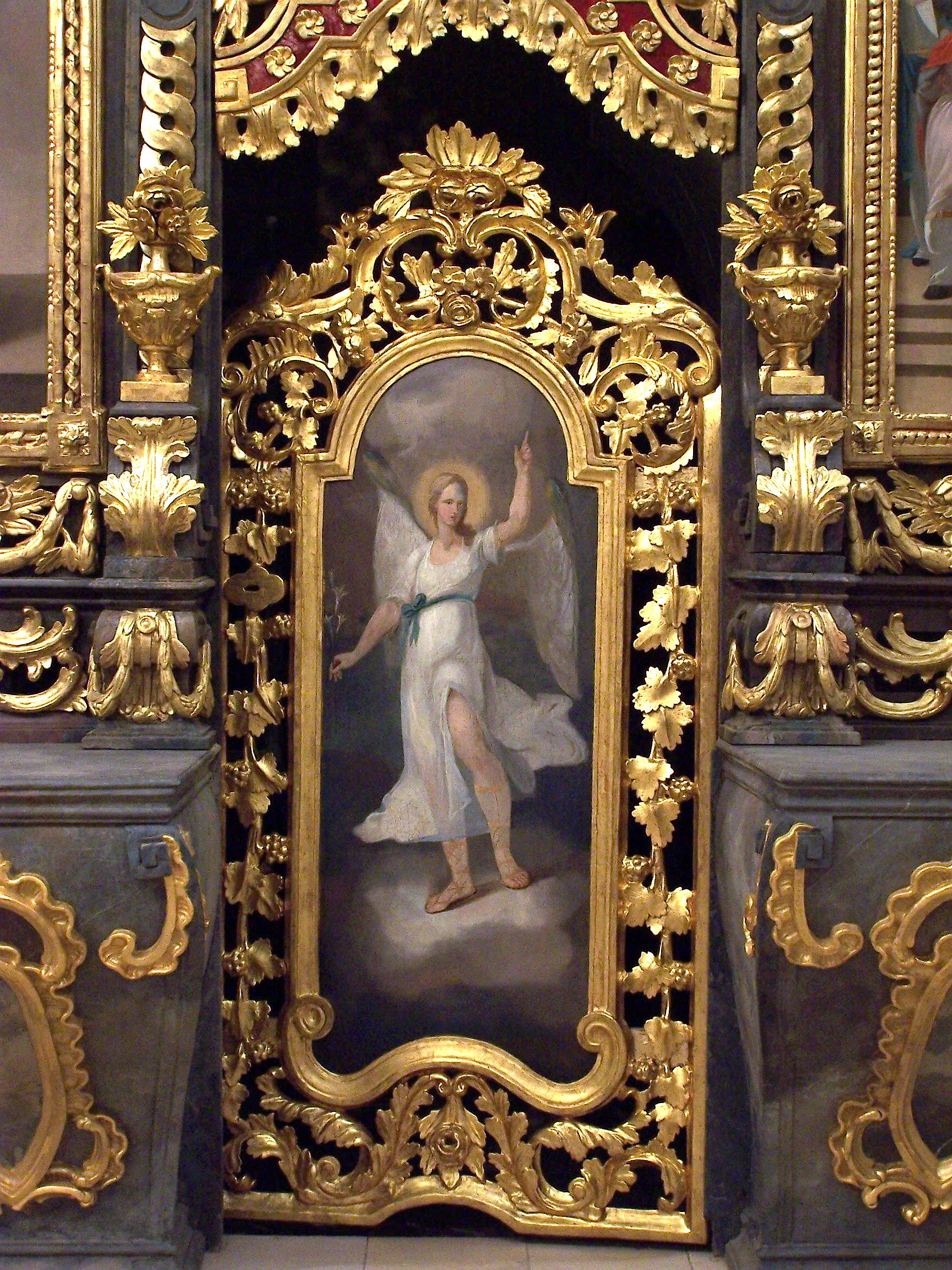
Gabriel

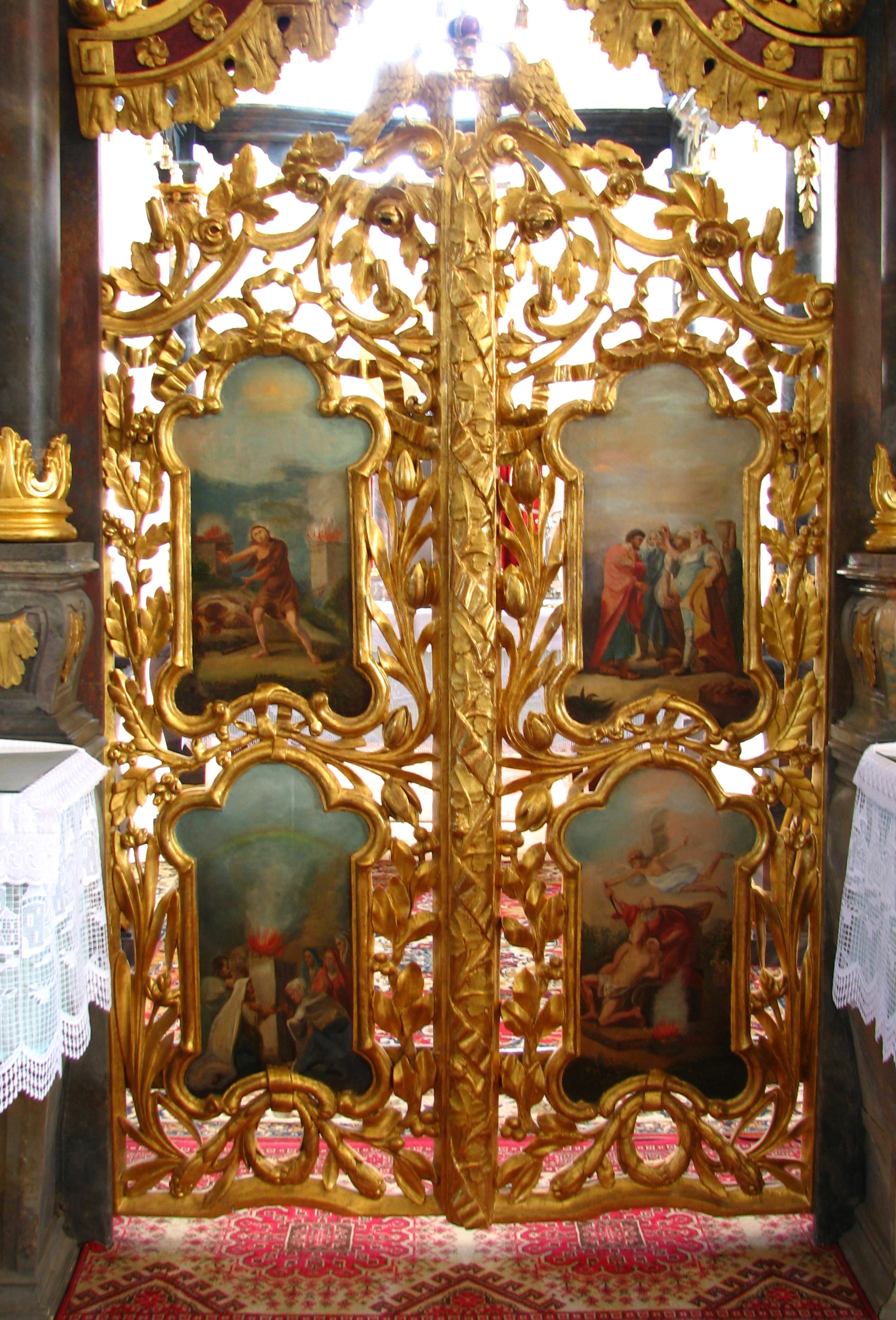
The Royal Doors

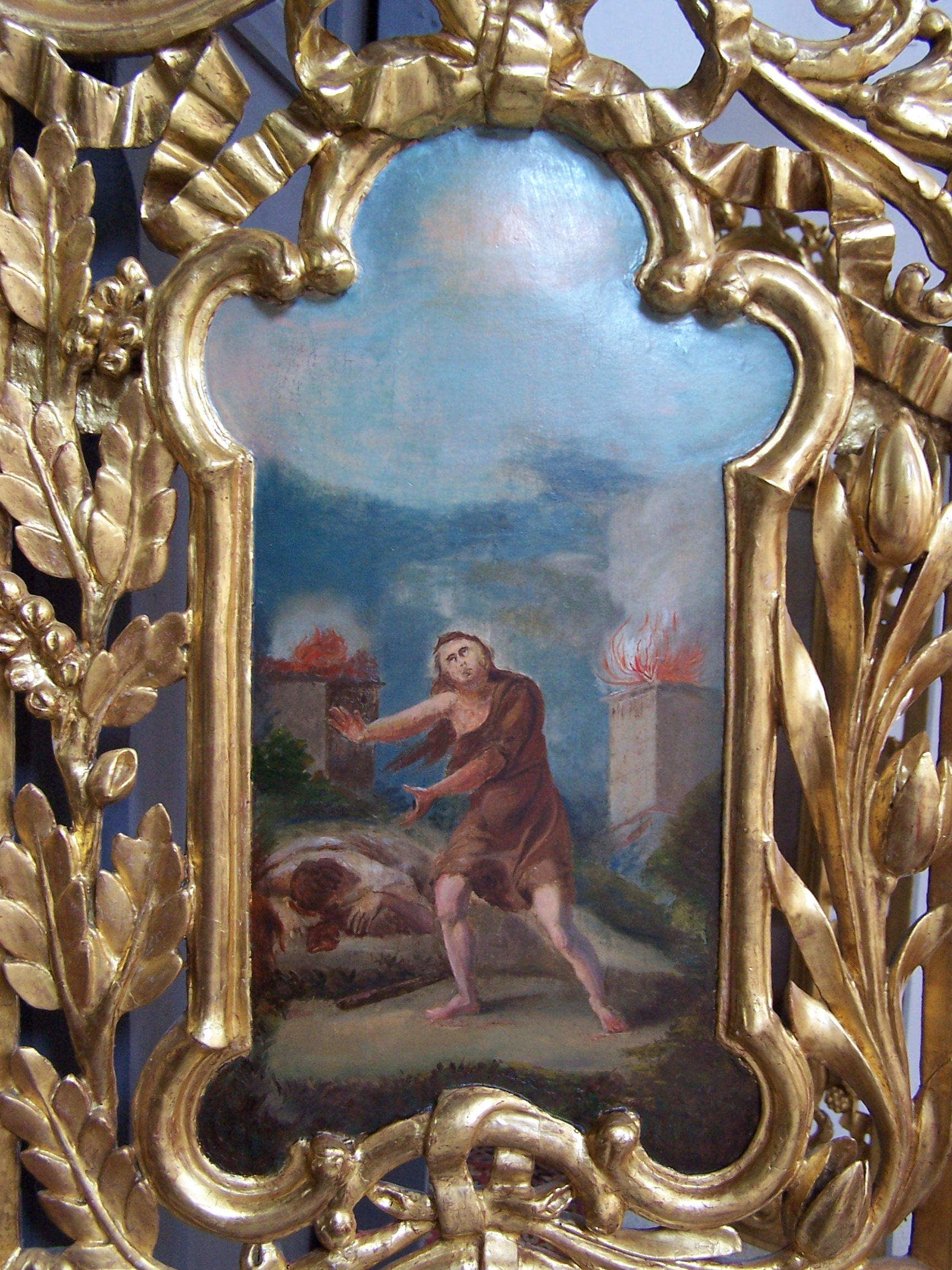
Cain slaying Abel

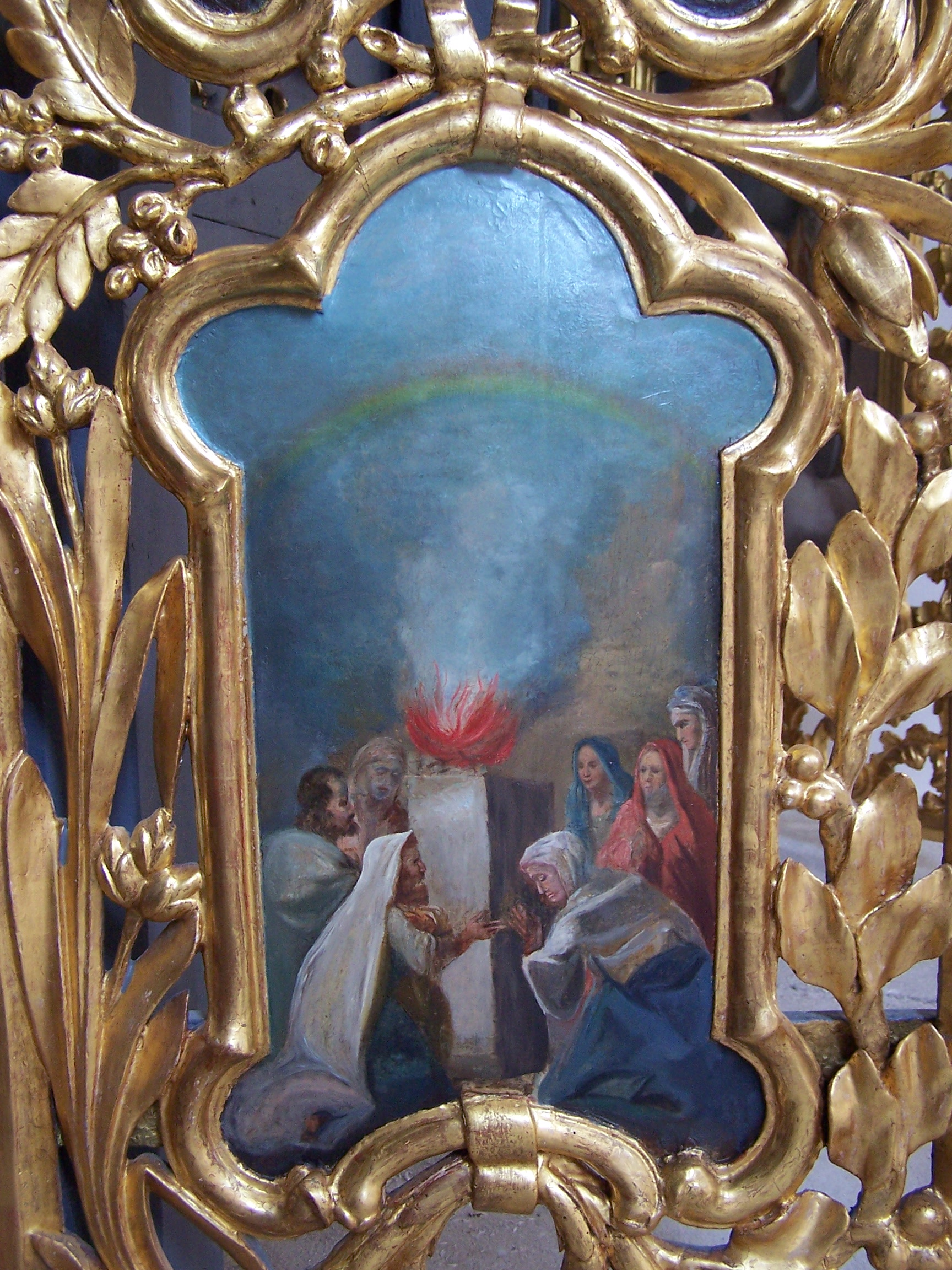
Noah's sacrifice

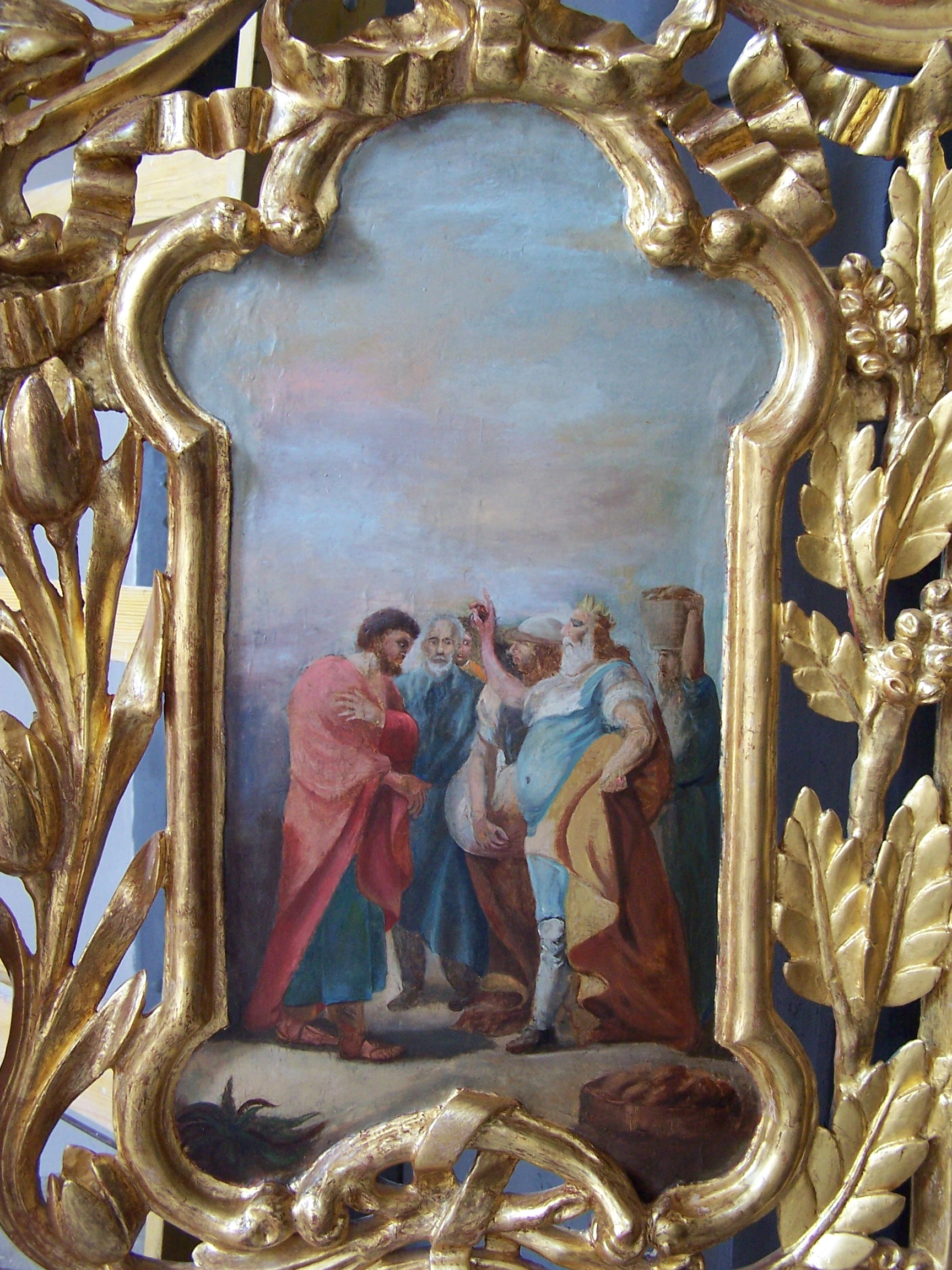
Meeting of Abram and Melchizedek

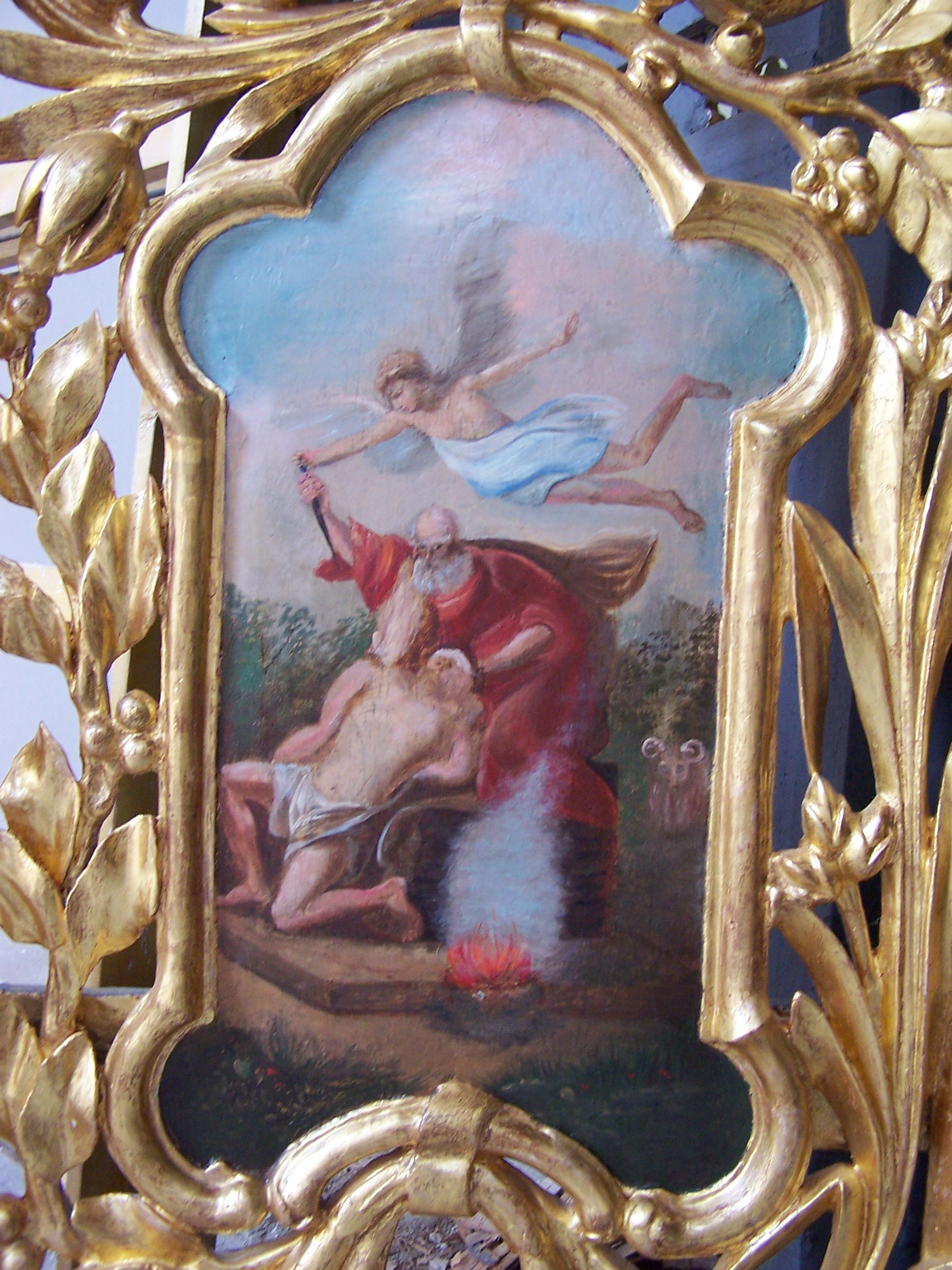
Binding of Isaac

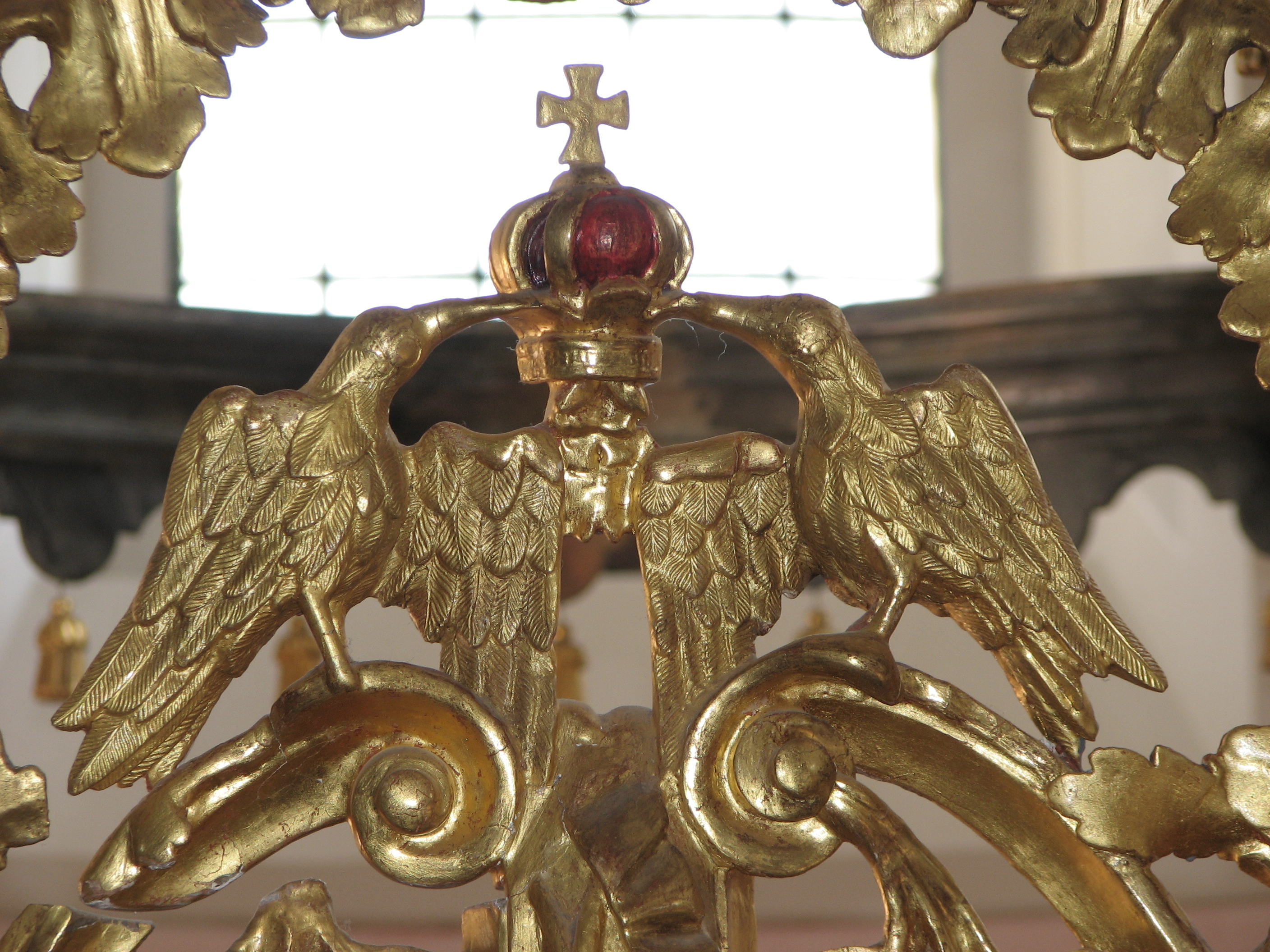
Ravens on top of the Royal Doors

There are four large icons between the doors. These were probably painted by Mátyás Hittner, since their style slightly differs from the icons above. The paintings of the Sovereign follow the traditional placement. On the northern side of the iconostasis is the icon of Saint Nicholas. In Hajdúdorog he is depicted in an episcopal vestment. He makes the gesture of teaching or blessing with his right hand, and he holds a crosier and a white handkerchief in his left. The icon of the Theotokos is on the left of the Royal Door. It is a traditional depiction of mother Mary holding her child in her arms. The child Jesus holds a blue orb in his left representing his rule above both our world and the others. His right hand makes the same gesture as Saint Nicholas. The icon on the other side of the Royal Door is that of the Pantocrator, which is a specific depiction of Christ. The Pantocrator, like the Theotokos icon, holds an orb in his left and makes the teaching gesture with his right. An open book lies before him, probably the New Testament based on the traditional depiction.
The two icons on either side of the Royal Doors are rather similar: Jesus was painted with an orb in his left hand, and he makes the same gesture with his right in both pictures. However, the icon of the Theotokos represents Jesus' first appearance among humans, while the Pantocrator icon refers to his second coming. Thus the royal gate – and with that the most important movements of the holy service – is situated between the first and the second coming of Jesus. There is another interesting relationship between the two paintings. In Byzantine iconography Mary and Jesus usually wear blue or white garments covered by a red toga. After the death of Christ the colors are inverted. This change appears on the Theotokos and the Pantocrator icons: Mary wears a white tunic with a red toga; the Pantocrator on the other side wears a red garment with a blue toga. The Virgin also wears a blue on red garment on the top of the iconostasis, when mourning her son's death. In Christian art, the combination of blue and red has further significance: red refers to the divine origin and blue symbolizes human nature. This is the reason Christian art so often depicts Jesus in red and blue garments.
The southernmost icon of the Sovereign row traditionally illustrates the feast or saint to which the church was dedicated. In Hajdúdorog it is the Presentation of Mary. The same scene appears one tier above, as well as among the Feasts.

Besides the four large icons, three trefoil shaped paintings also belong to the first, Sovereign tier. Each of them is situated above a door. The scene of Jacob's Ladder is above the northern Deacons' Door, while the burning bush was painted above the southern one with Moses and God's angel on it. The Last Supper is placed above the Royal Door, according to tradition. This is the most important sacrificial scene of the New Testament. Below the icon, on the Royal Door, there are four paintings each representing a sacrifice from the Old Testament. In this way the Last Supper connects the two testaments of the Bible.

Icons of the Sovereign
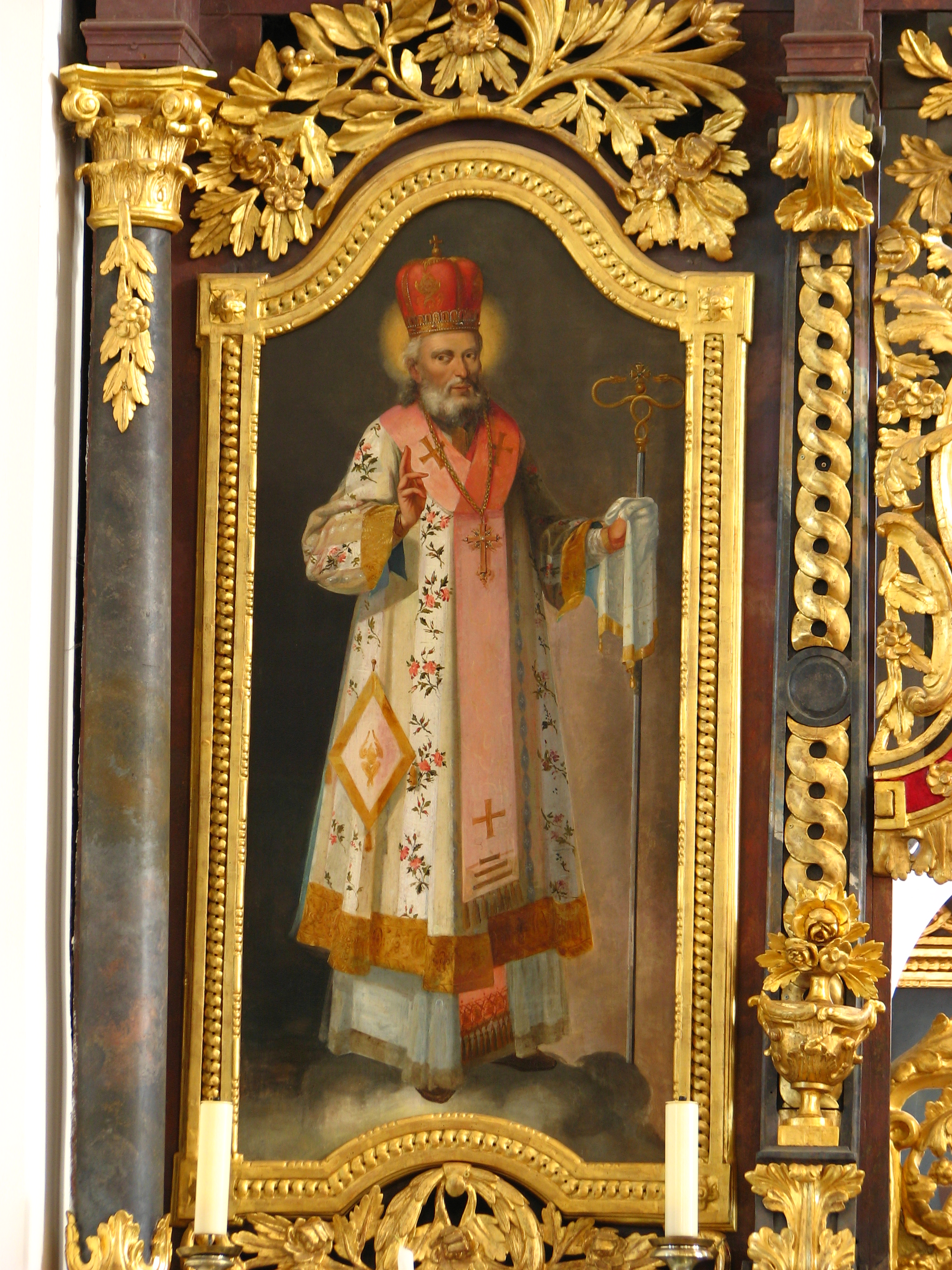
Saint Nicholas

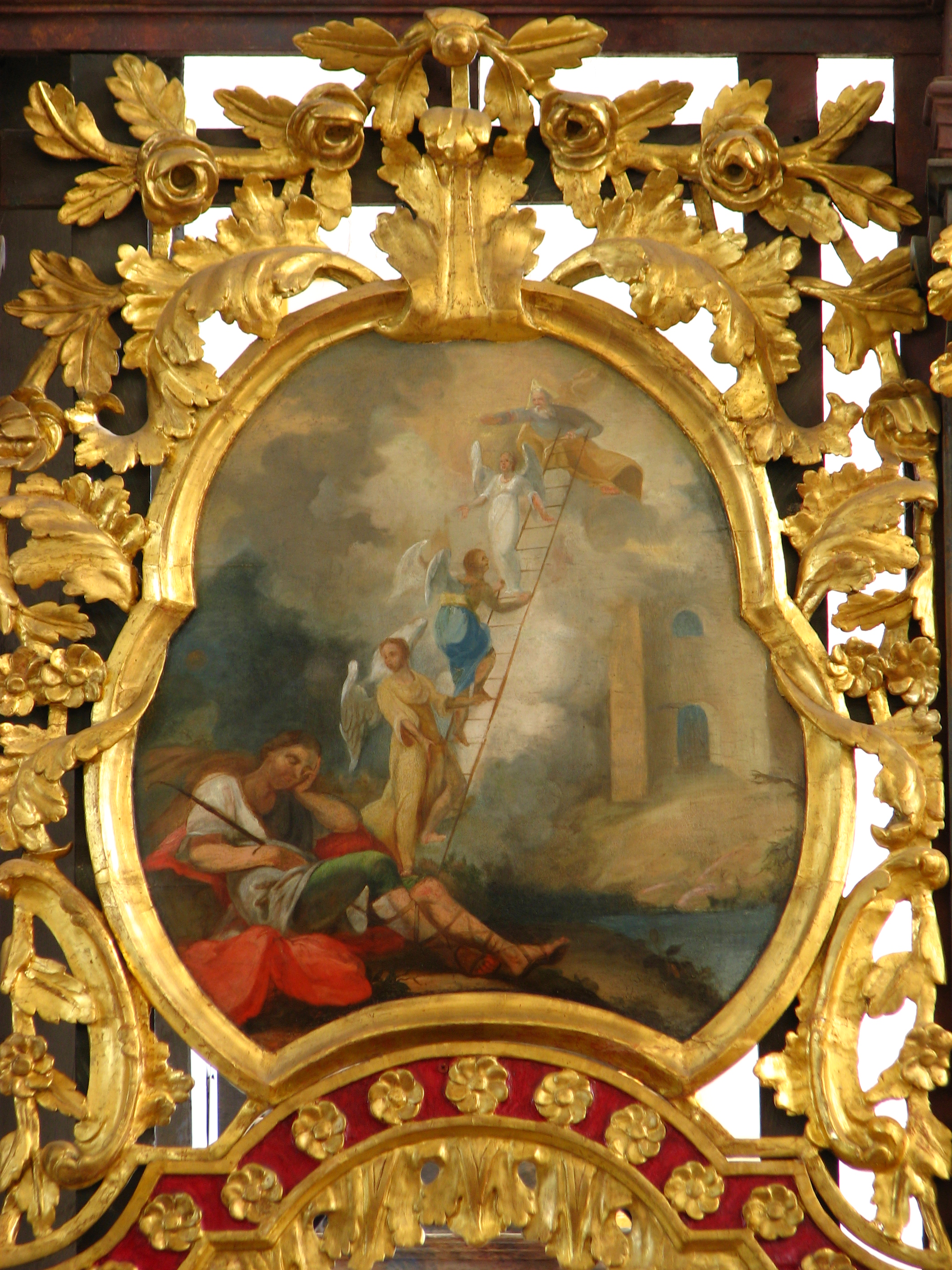
Jacob's Ladder

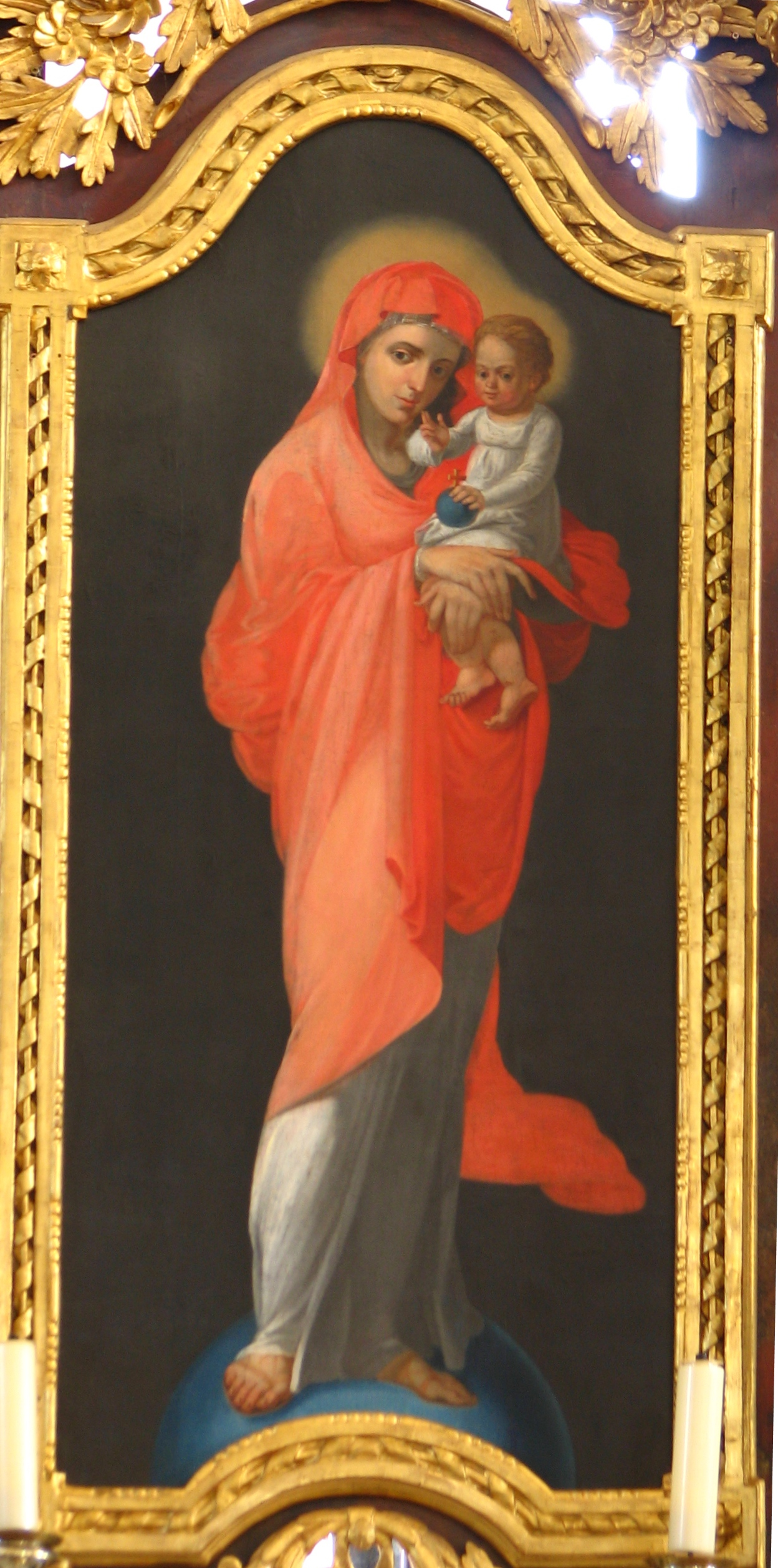
Theotokos

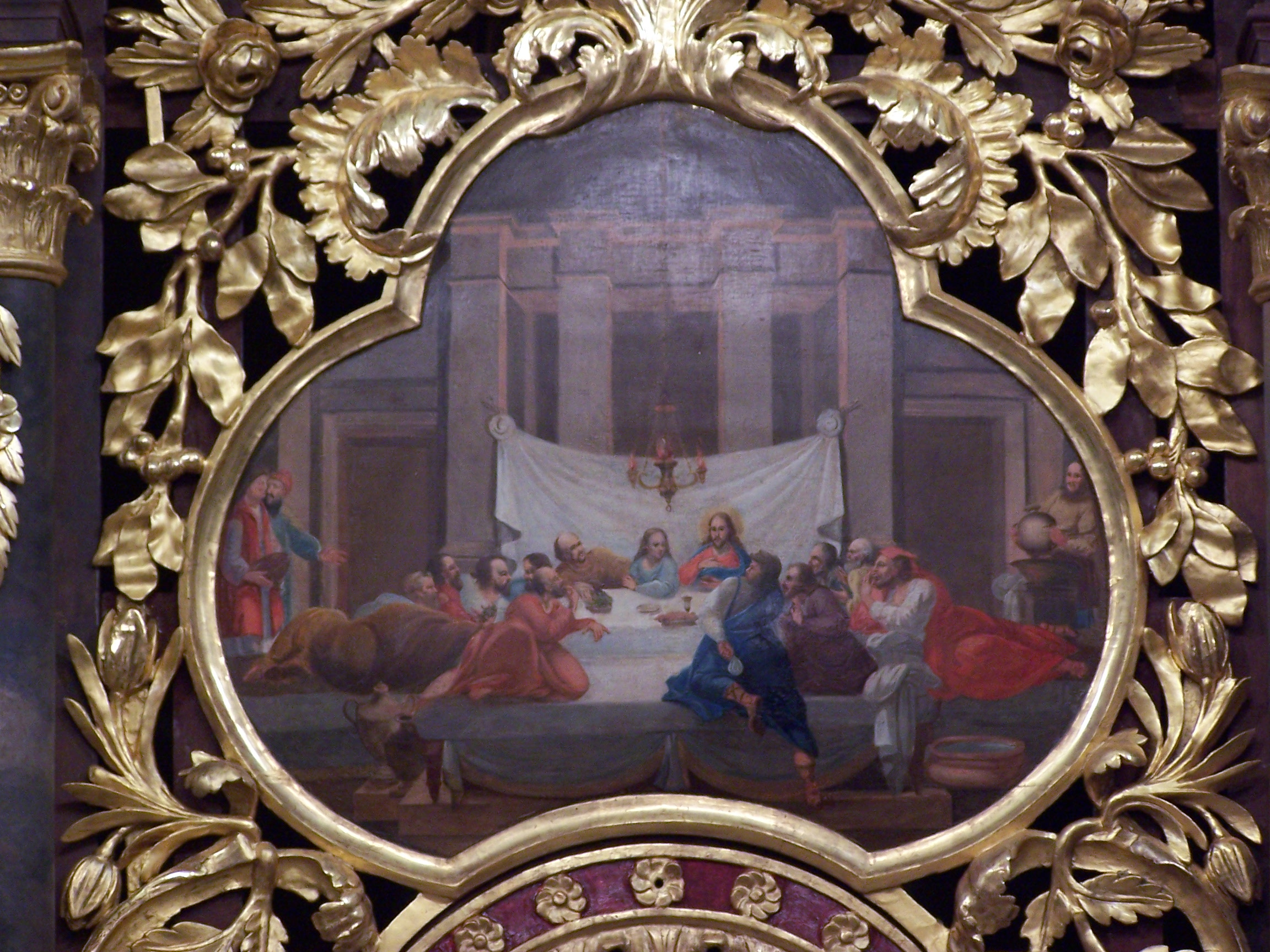
Last Supper

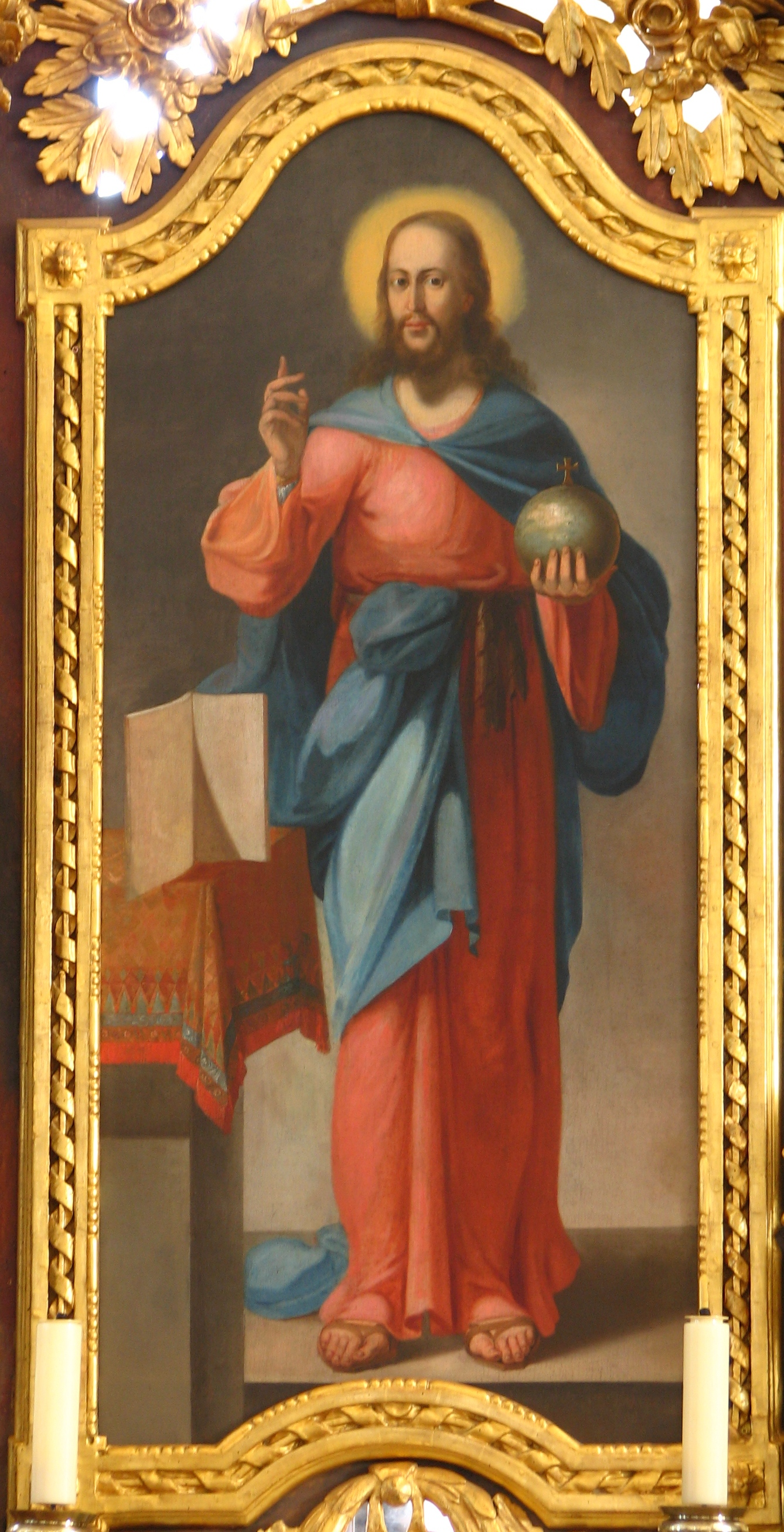
Pantocrator

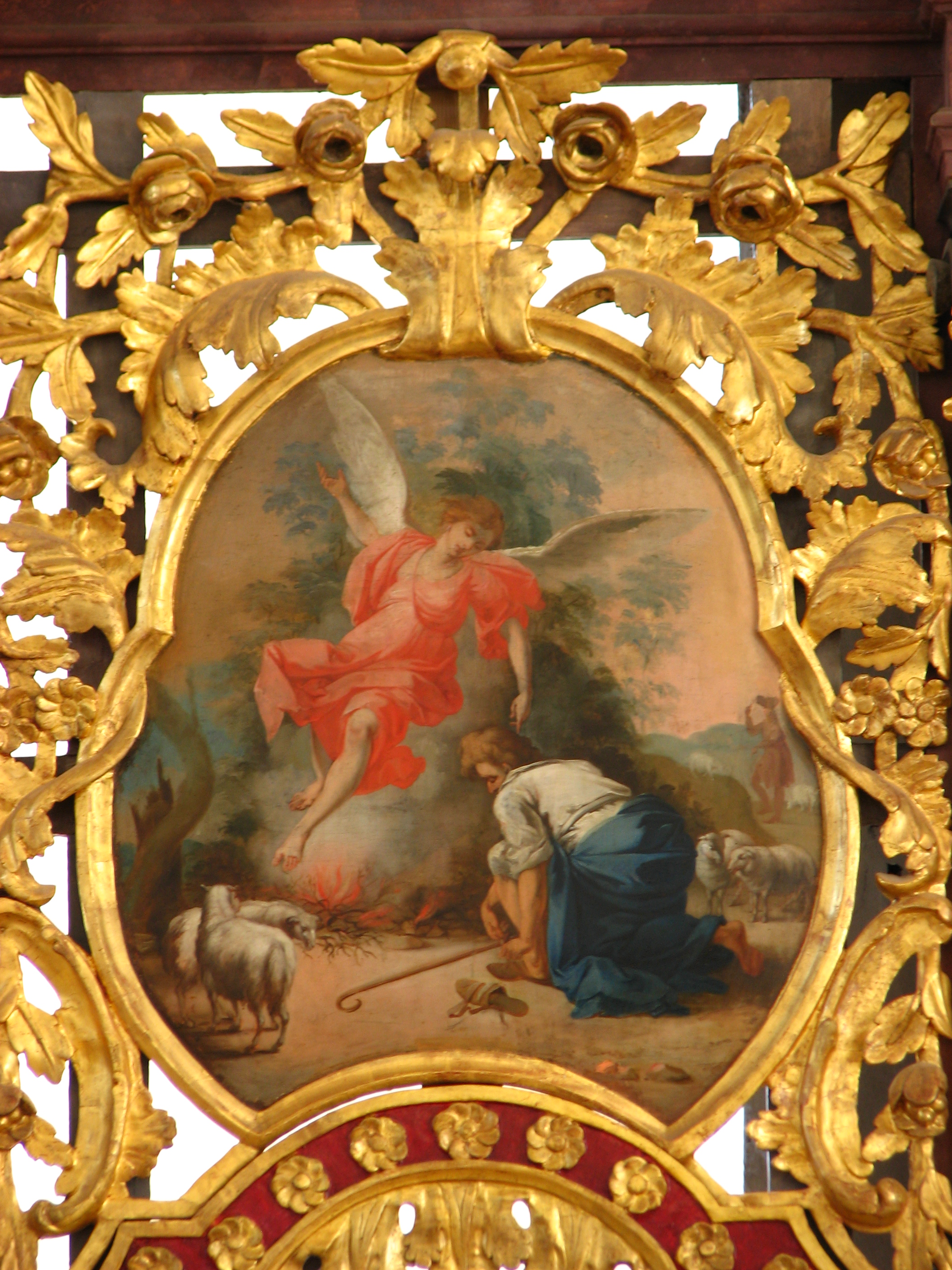
Moses at the burning bush

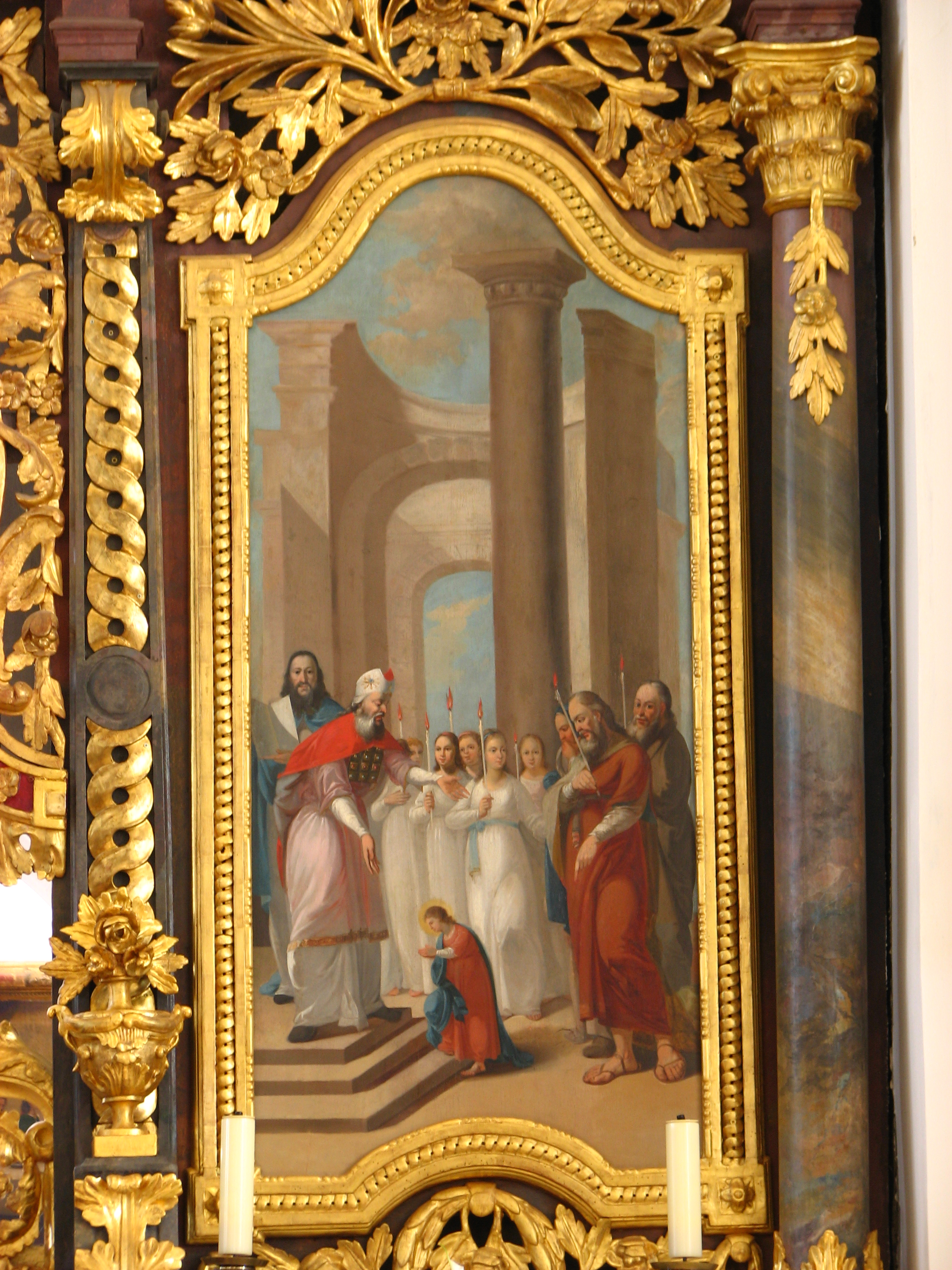
Presentation of Mary

Above the Sovereign, the second tier contains the icons of the twelve great feasts. There are two large icons above the Royal Door, that divide the three central tiers of the iconostasis into two equal parts. Six icons, related to the life of Mary, appear on the left side of the Feasts tier. These icons depict scenes related to Mary. On the far left there is the Nativity of the Theotokos, which has Saint Anne sitting in the center, holding the newborn Mary on her lap. An angel holds a wreath of glory above them, and the Holy Spirit shines in the shape of the Eye of Providence on the top of the composition. The Greek Catholic Church celebrates Mary's birth on September 8. The second icon from the left depicts the Presentation of Mary, celebrated on November 21. This is the feast with which the cathedral was associated. In the painting the child Mary steps forward to Zechariah, the priest of the temple in Jerusalem. The next image illustrates the scene of the Annunciation, when Gabriel visits the Virgin Mary to announce to her that she is conceived with Jesus. Gabriel holds a white lily in his left hand, and points to the sky with his right. The beam of light, coming down from God via the dove of the Holy Spirit onto Mary, symbolizes that the Holy Virgin became pregnant by God himself through the Holy Spirit. The Annunciation is celebrated nine months before the birth of Jesus, on March 25. The next icon depicts the Visitation, when Mary visits her cousin, Elizabeth, who is pregnant with John the Baptist. Traditionally the icon of the Visitation portrays the two pregnant women, Mary and Elizabeth hugging each other. In Hajdúdorog this scene is quite different: Elizabeth does not even appear in the painting. Mary, on the right, brings two white doves in a basket as gifts to her cousin. The family members introduce the newborn John to her. March 31 is the feast day of the Visitation. The fifth icon on the tier is the flight to Egypt. This is the only scene on the Feasts tier which cannot be associated with any religious feast. Joseph leaves Bethlehem with Mary and Jesus after learning that King Herod wants to massacre all the newborns in Judea. The last icon on the Marian part of the Feasts tier is the Dormition, the death of Mary. The Holy Virgin, in a white shroud, lies in the center of the image. Jesus casts light on his mother from Heaven as a symbol of her eternal life and her assumption. The Greek Catholic Church commemorates Mary's death on August 15.

Icons related to Marian Feasts tier
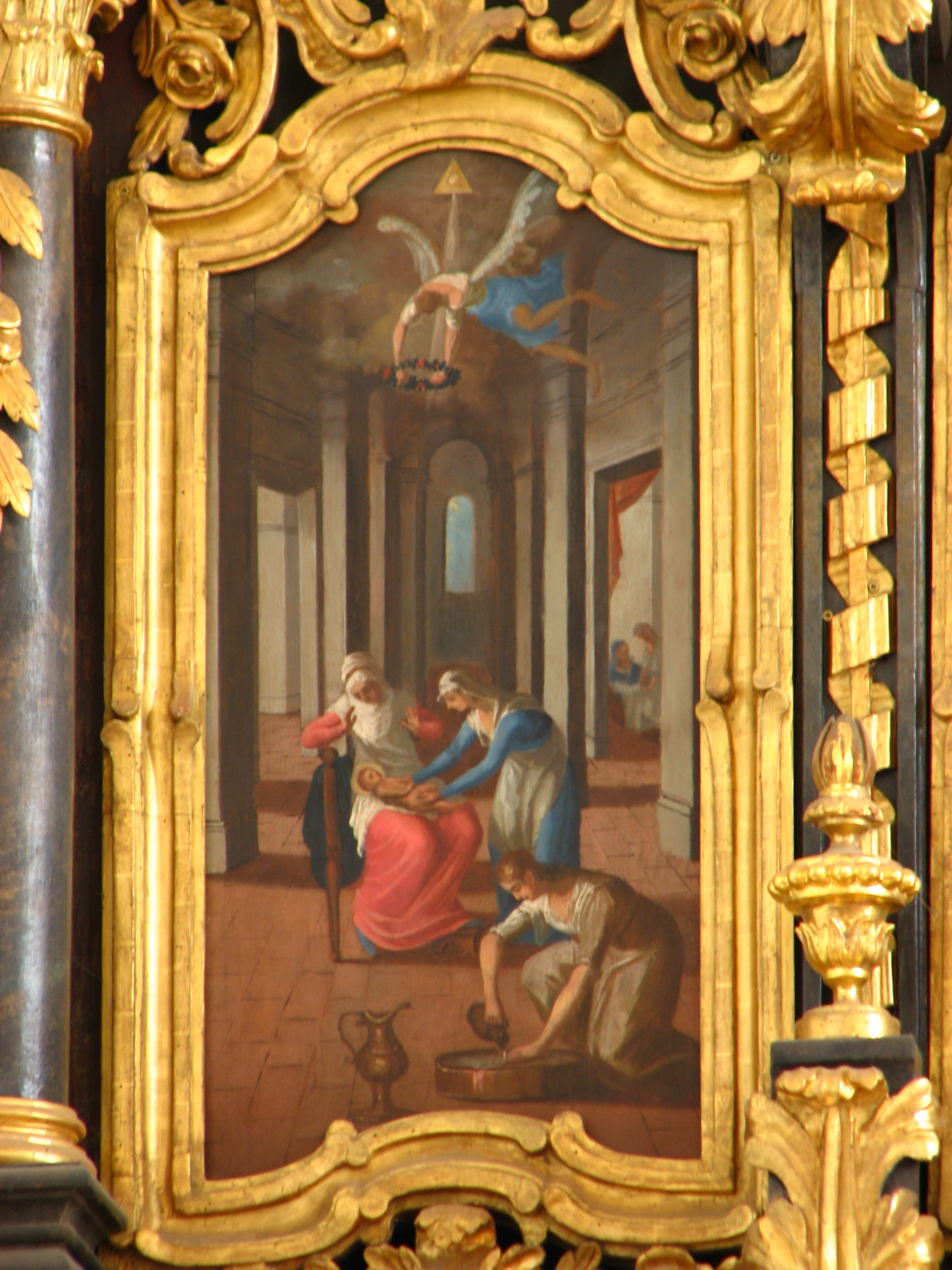
Nativity of the Theotokos

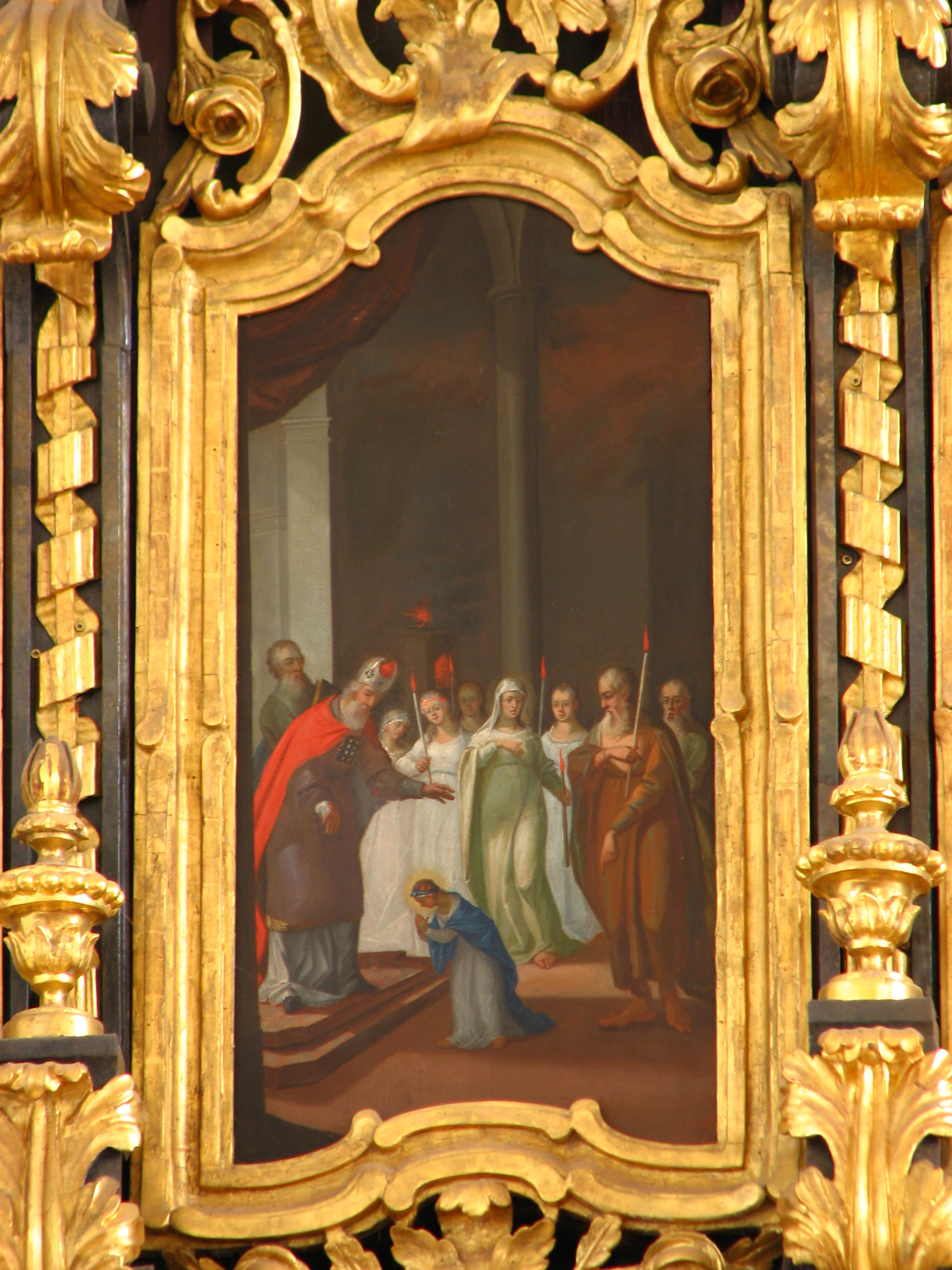
Presentation of Mary

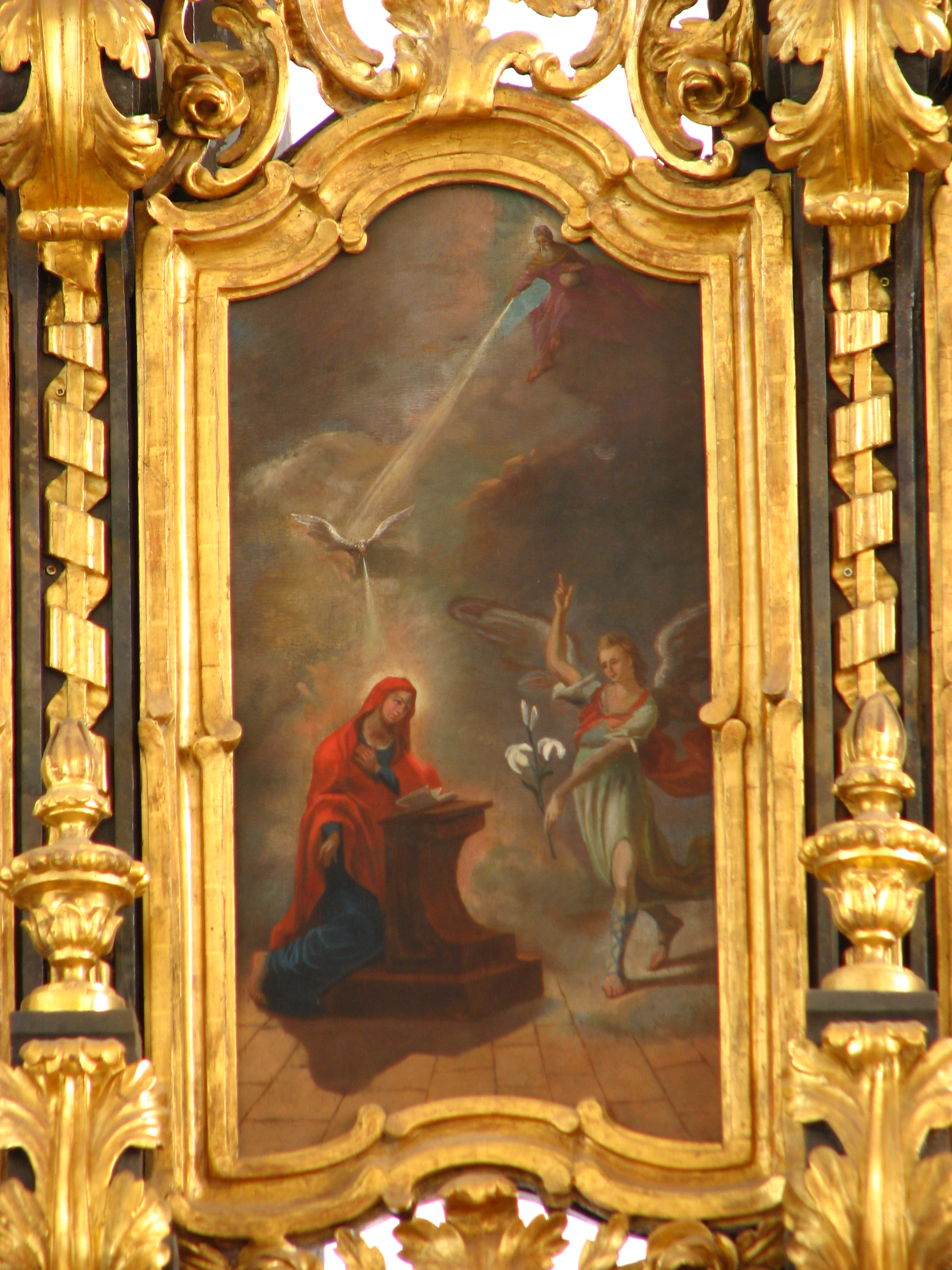
Annunciation

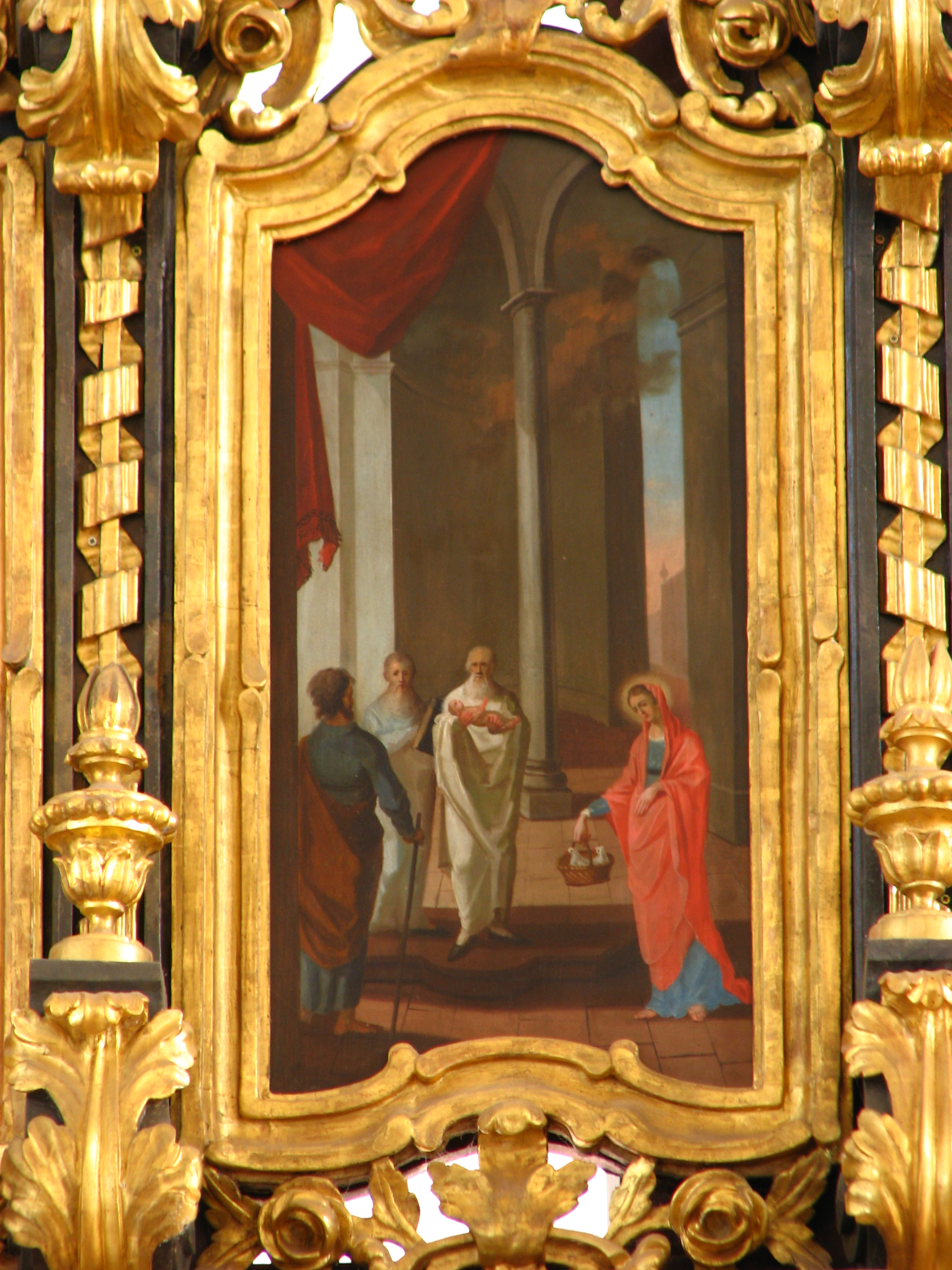
Visitation

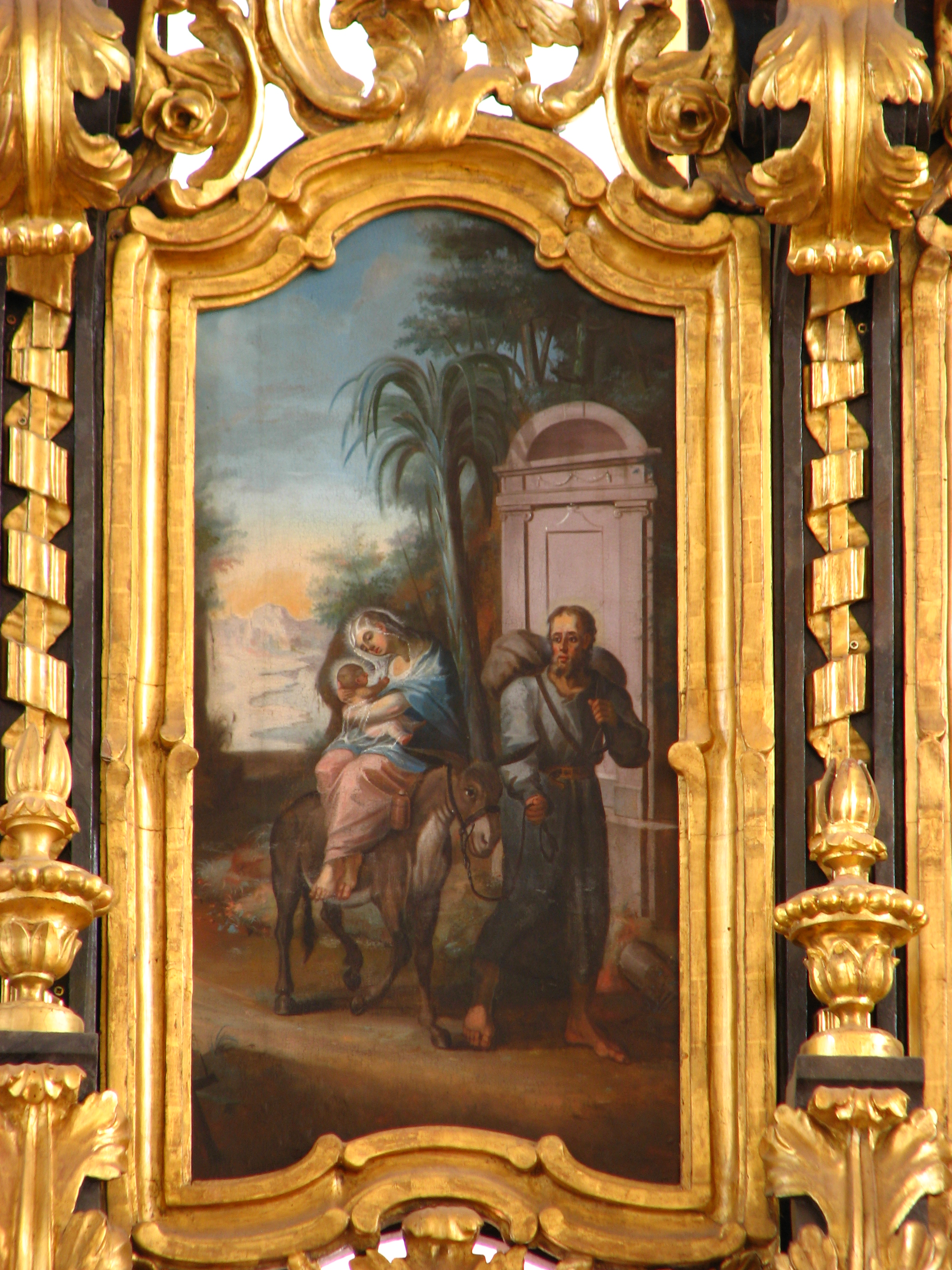
Flight to Egypt

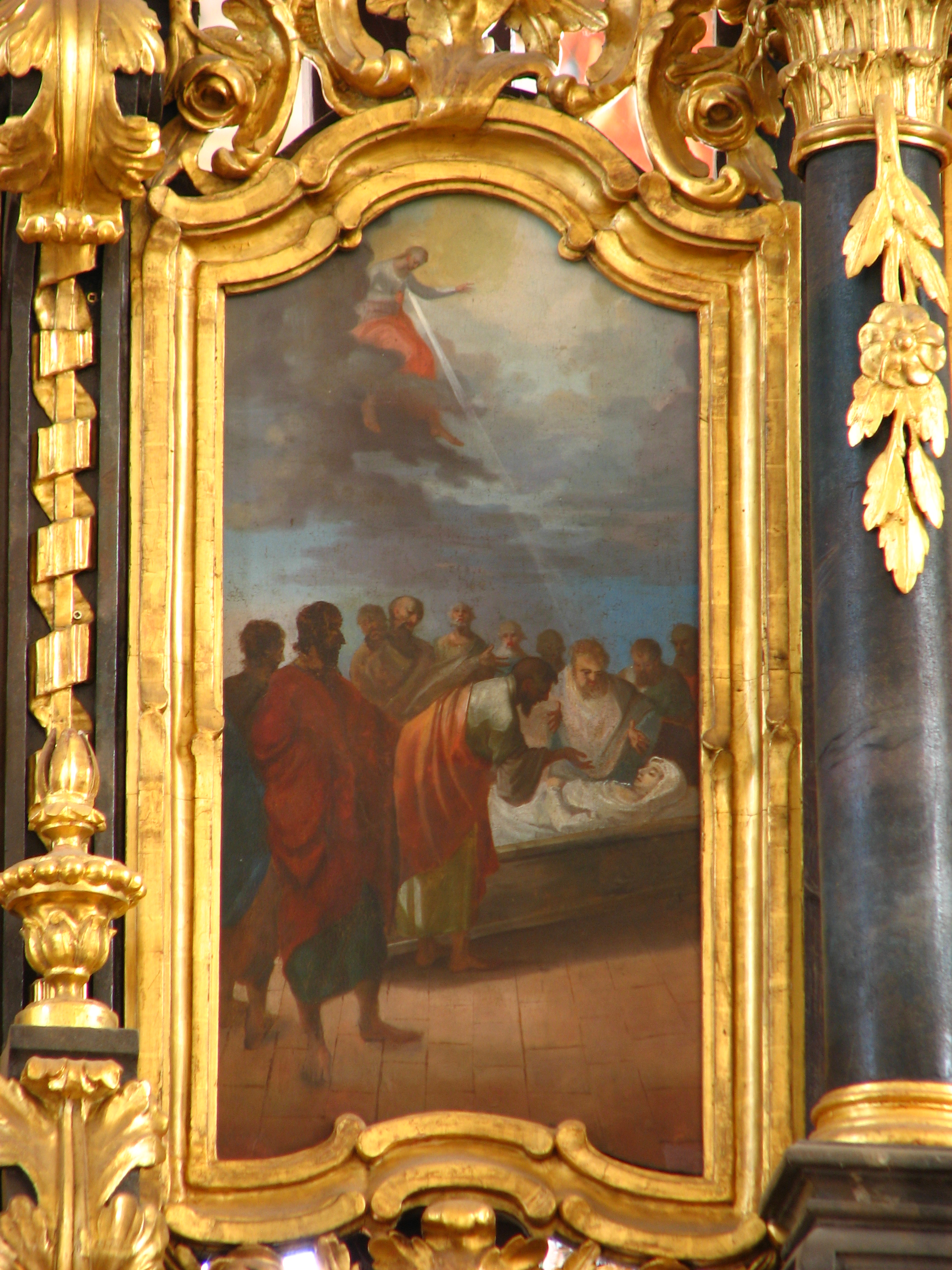
Dormition

Six scenes from the life of Jesus continue on the Feasts tier to the right from the central axis of the iconostasis. These icons are the most eventful paintings of the whole icon screen. The first image, following the chronology, is the Nativity of Jesus, celebrated on the first day of Christmas, on December 25. In the center of the painting the infant Jesus is resting in a manger. He holds a blue orb in his right hand. Joseph and Mary are standing behind the baby. There are seven shepherds around the manger, each of them coming to express their veneration for the divine baby. Three angels praise the infant Redeemer on the top of the icon. The next image depicts the baptism of Christ, celebrated on January 6 as Epiphany. Jesus is standing in the River Jordan in front of John the Baptist. John pours water upon Christ's head from a shell, while he prays to his Father. The Holy Spirit as a white dove appears in the background of the painting, above three ladies who are watching the baptism. The third icon illustrates the transfiguration of Jesus, celebrated on August 6. Christ is metamorphosed and becomes radiant upon a mountain in front of three of his disciples: Peter, James and John. On the icon Moses appears on Jesus' right, while Elijah is on his left. The three frightened apostles are lying in front of them. The next icon shows the entry into Jerusalem, which is celebrated on Palm Sunday, a week before Easter Sunday. Jesus arrives in Jerusalem on a donkey, which symbolizes his coming in peace rather than as a triumphal king arriving on a horse. The crowd scatters flowers in front of Christ. The next icon is the Ascension of Christ, which also appears on the central axis of the iconostasis between the third and fourth tiers. The last painting on the tier depicts the descent of the Holy Spirit, the feast of Pentecost. The Holy Spirit is rendered as a white dove on the icon, and flames appear above each apostle to encourage them. Mary is in the center of the composition, surrounded by 11 apostles - Judas is not present.

Icons related to Jesus on the Feasts tier
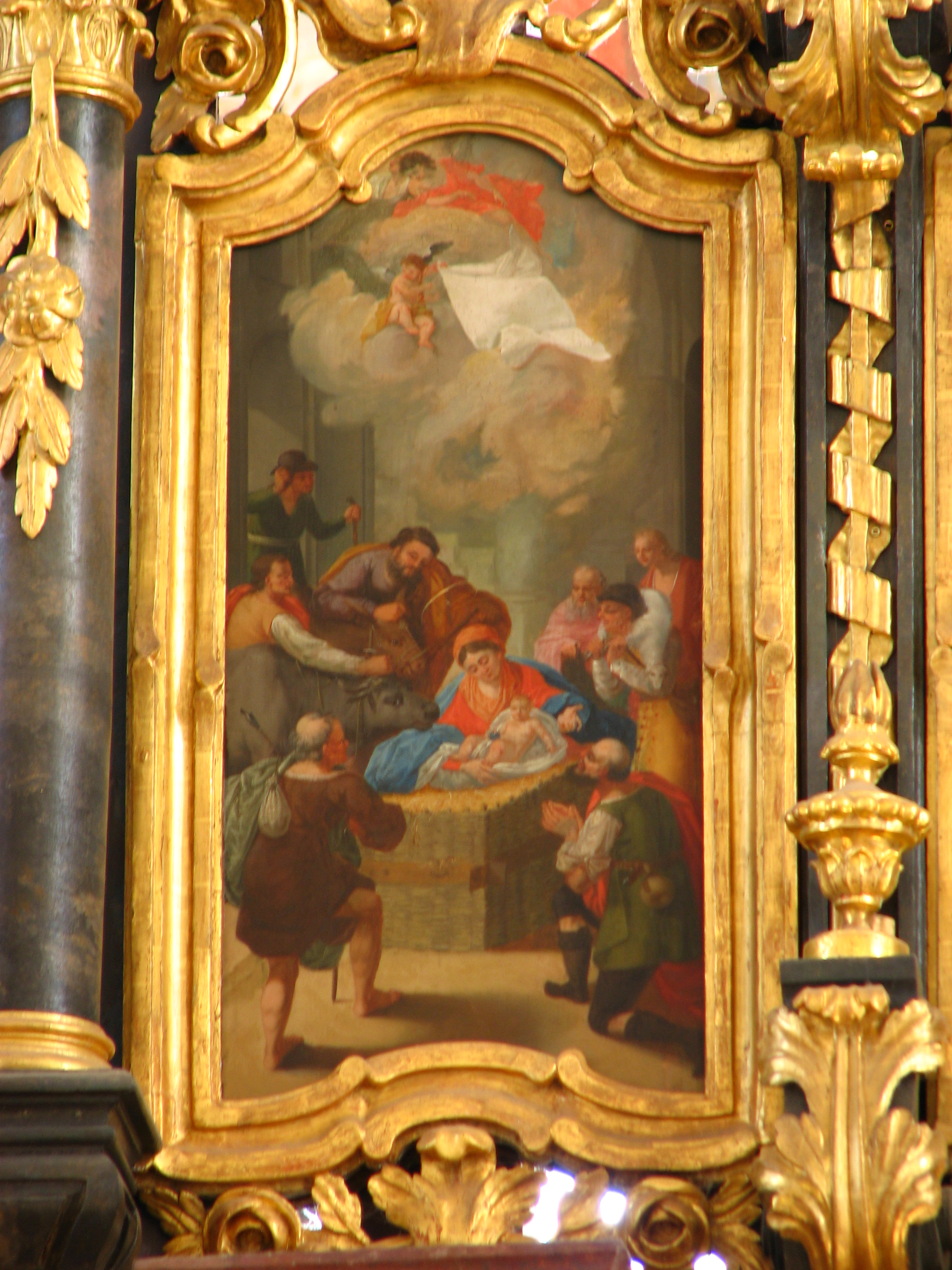
Nativity of Jesus

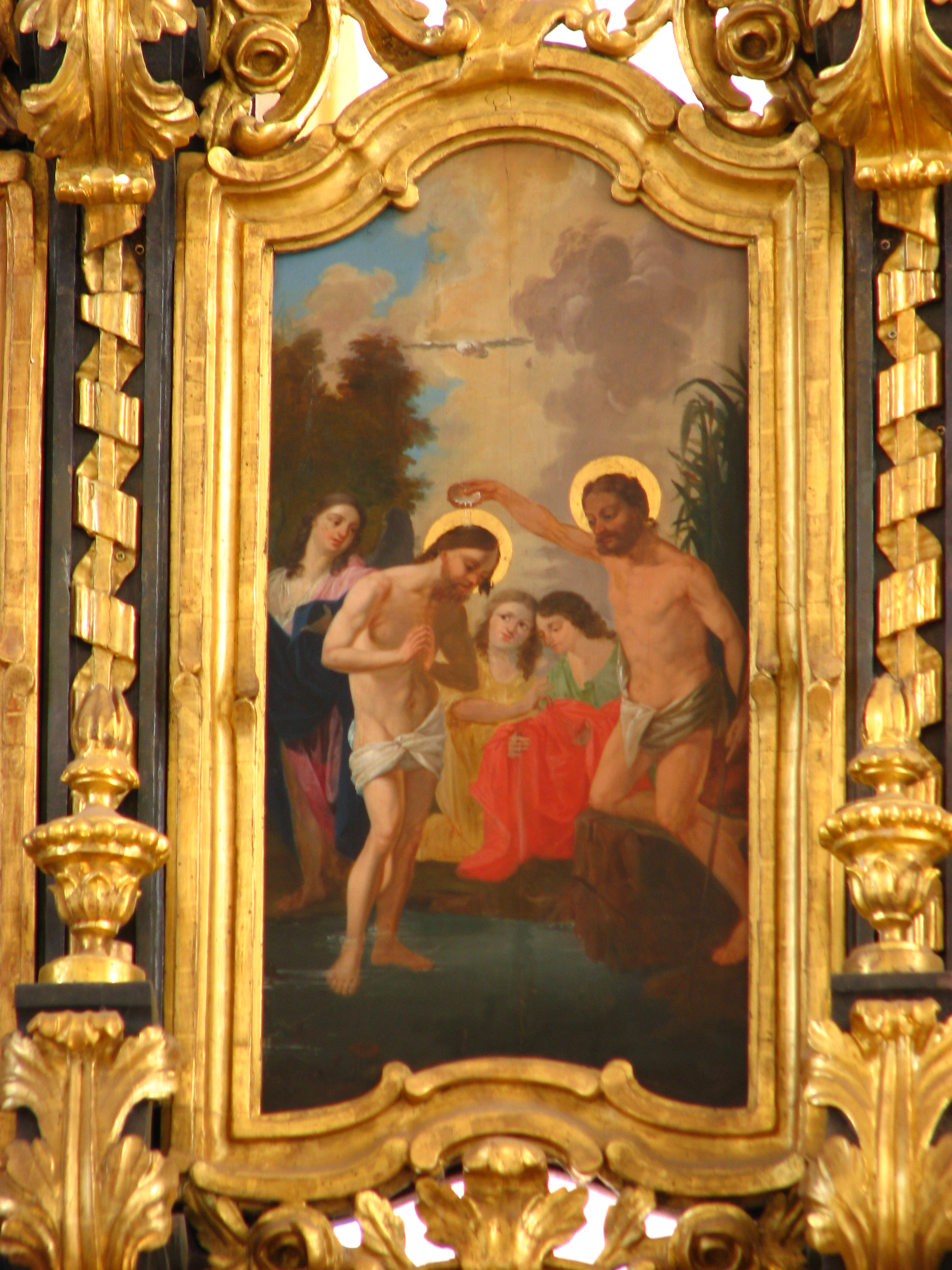
Baptism of Christ

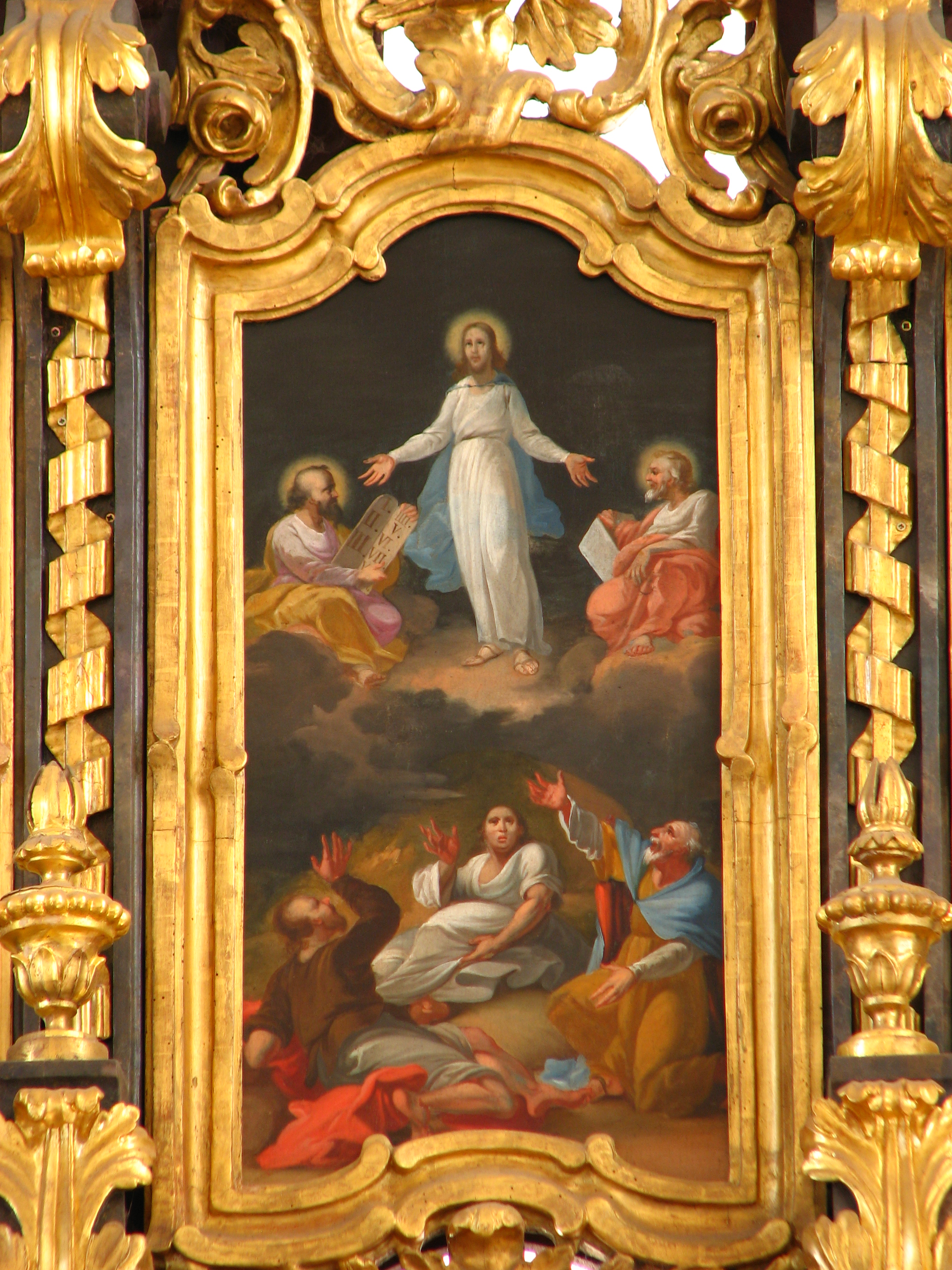
Transfiguration of Jesus

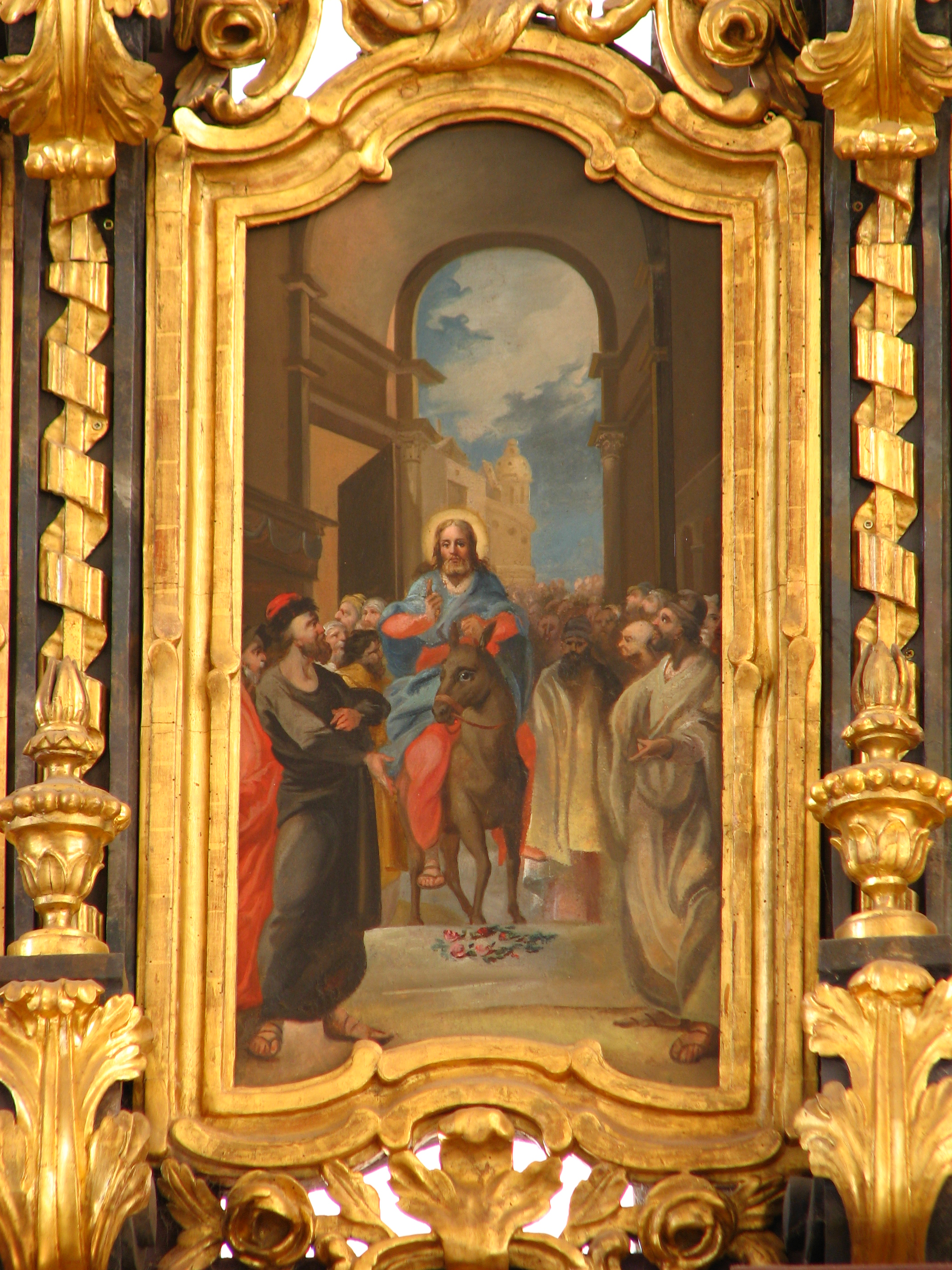
Entry into Jerusalem

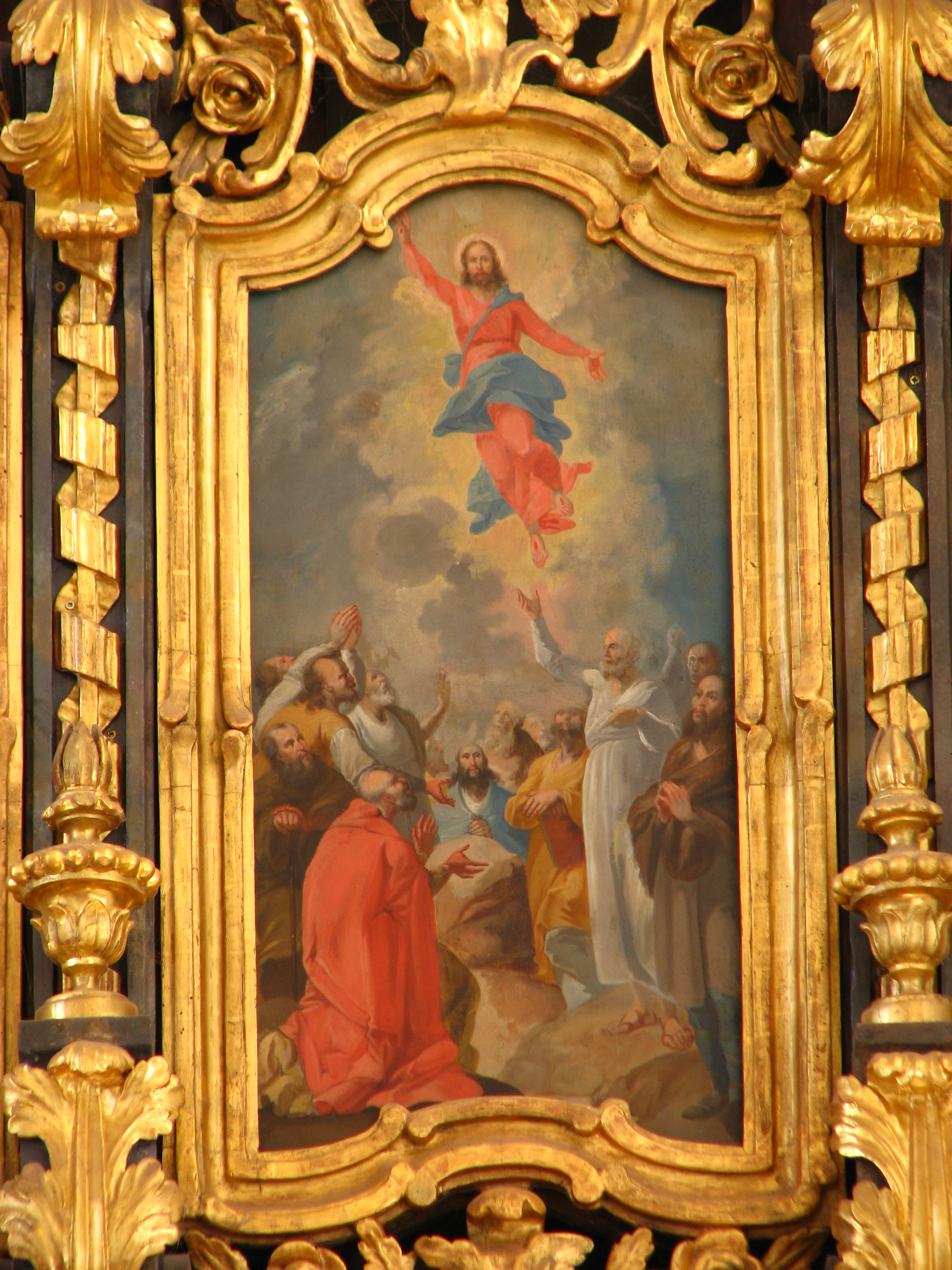
Ascension of Jesus Christ

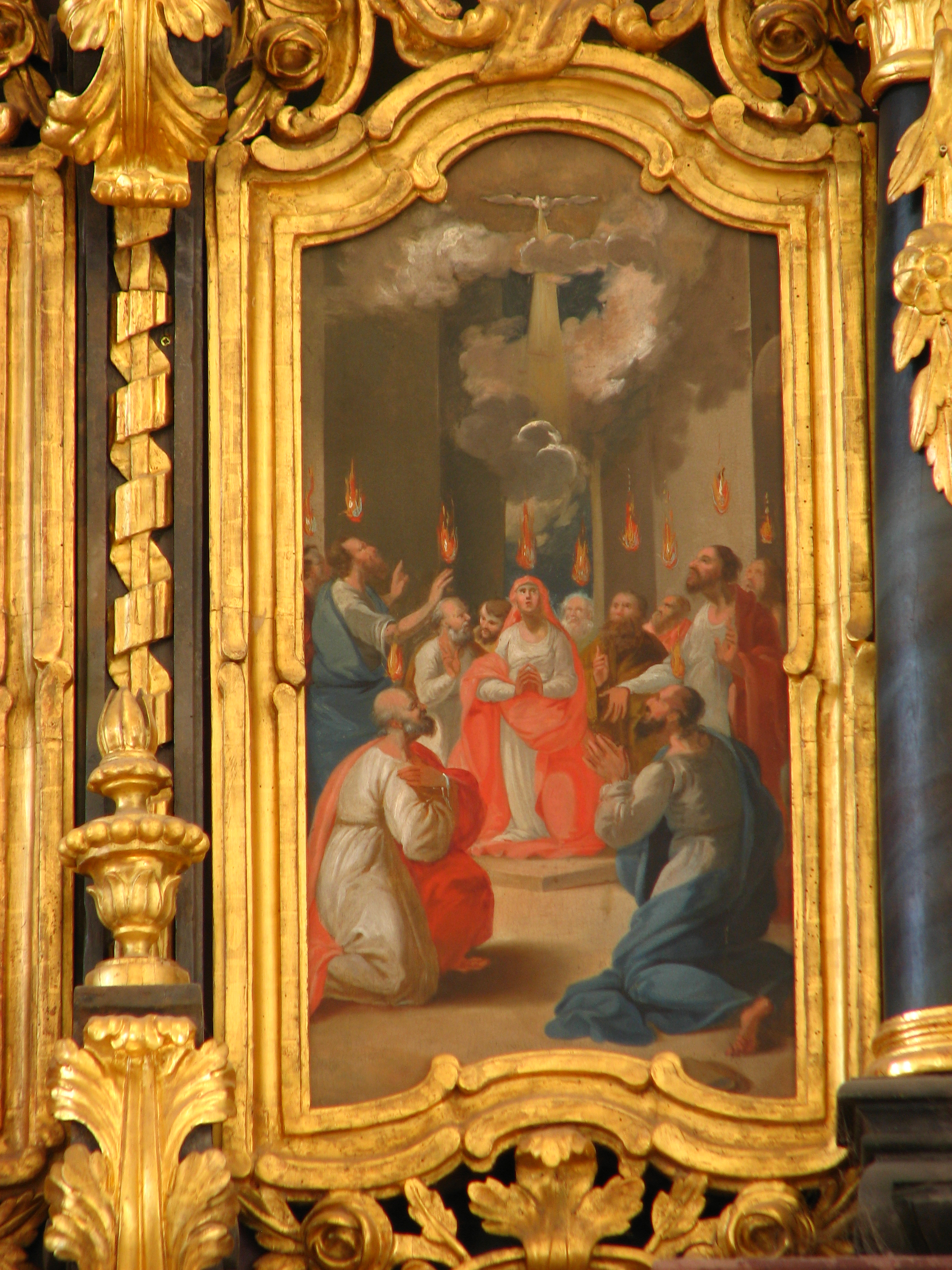
The Descent of the Holy Spirit

The figures on the next two tiers turn slightly towards Christ's large icon in the central axis of the iconostasis. The third tier, above the Feasts is called the Apostles' tier. As this row has 12 paintings like the Feasts tier, it would be logical to suppose each icon displayed one of Jesus' disciples. But that is not the case here, in fact only eight of the twelve apostles appear on this tier. From the left, the first icon depicts apostle Thomas. The "doubting" disciple was originally a carpenter. He holds a spear in his right hand, symbolizing his martyrdom in India. Bartholomew is the next in the row. Originally he was a peasant, and according to the Christian legend, he died in Armenia, flayed alive and crucified, head downward. Bartholomew holds his own flayed skin in his hand as a symbol of his death. The next apostle is Andrew, Peter's brother. Legend says that he was crucified in Patras, Greece on a Crux decussata (X-shaped cross), now commonly known as a Saint Andrew's Cross. He is portrayed with this cross. Andrew is followed by Mark the Evangelist. He was painted with a quill in his right hand, and his own gospel in his left. Close to him is the icon of Matthew the Evangelist, who was painted in a rather similar way to Mark. Red and white shades dominate his garment too, and he also holds a quill and his gospel. The last icon on the left side of the Apostles tier, the closest to Jesus' central image, portrays Peter. He was the leader of the apostles, and though he died as a martyr in Rome, he is not associated with his martyrdom on the icon. He holds the Keys of Heaven in his hands.

Apostles tier
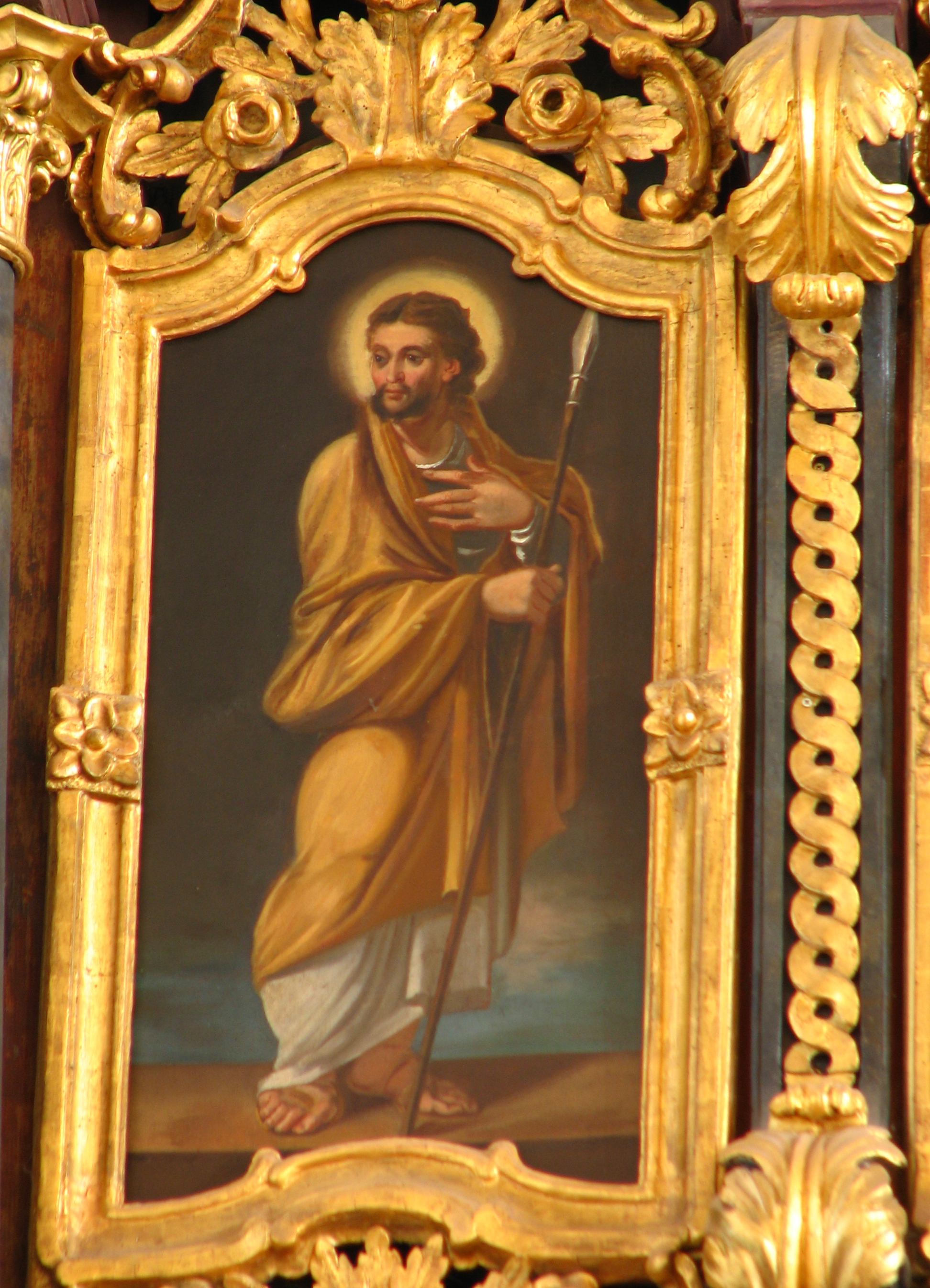
Thomas

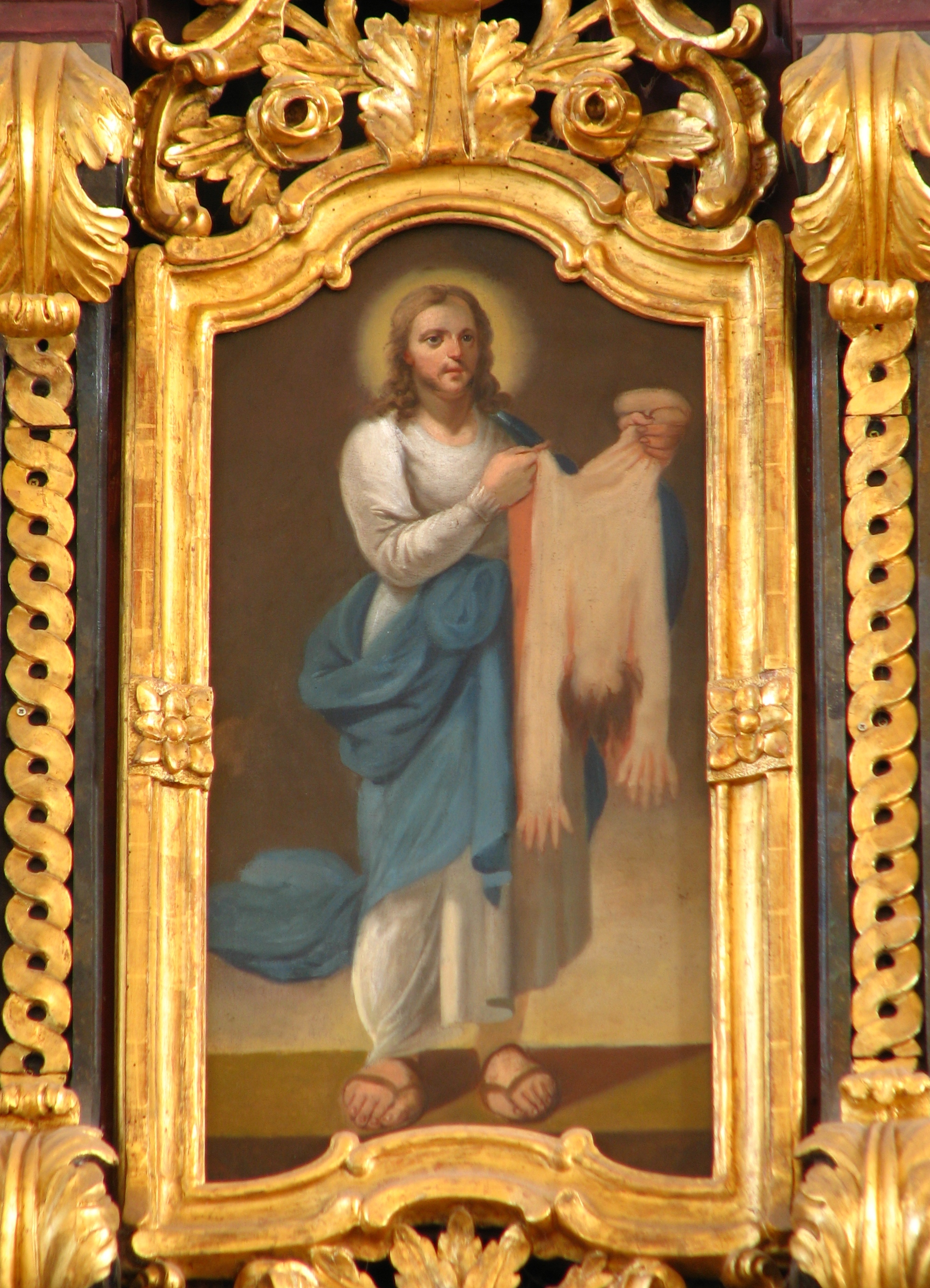
Bartholomew

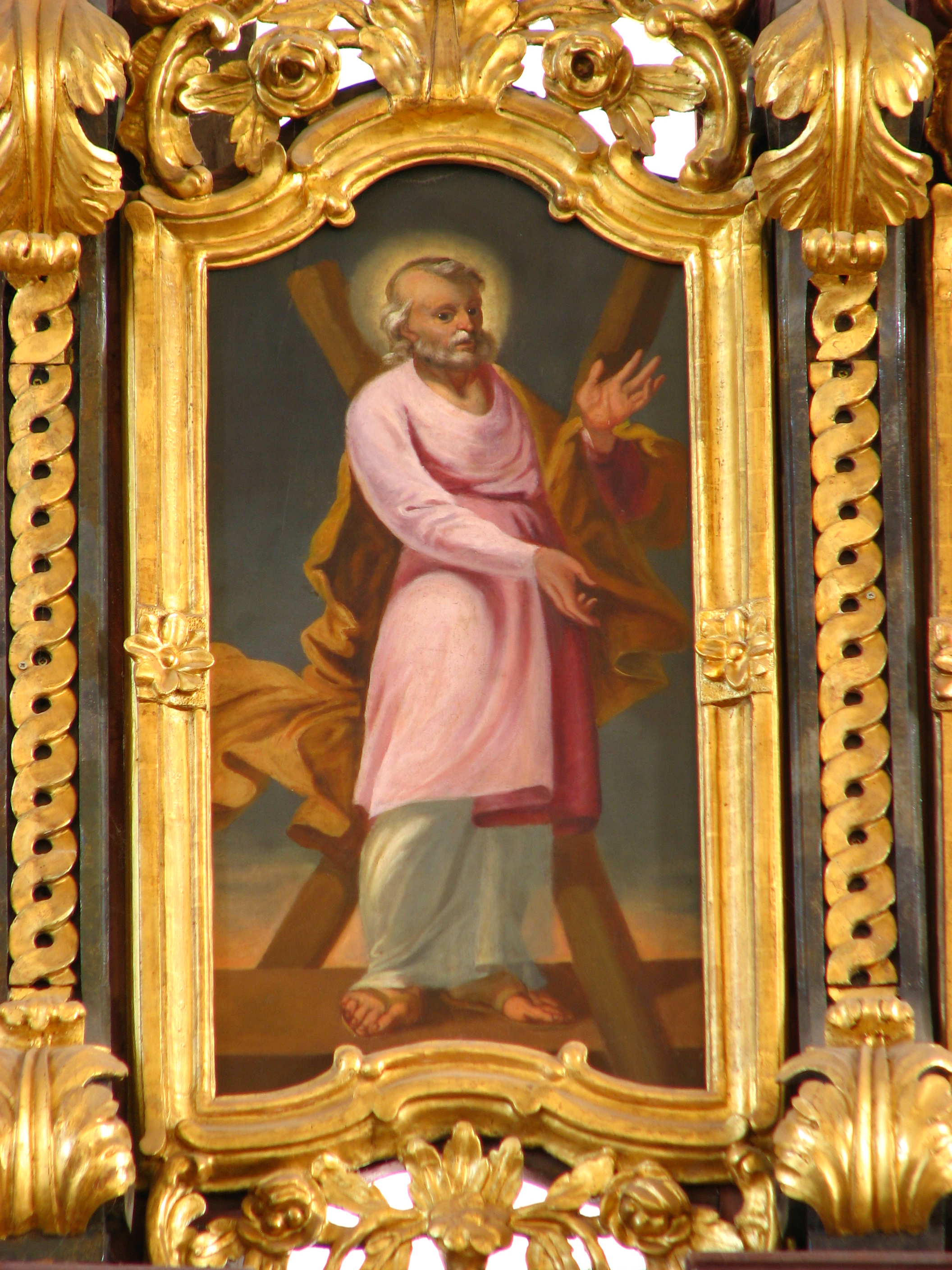
Andrew

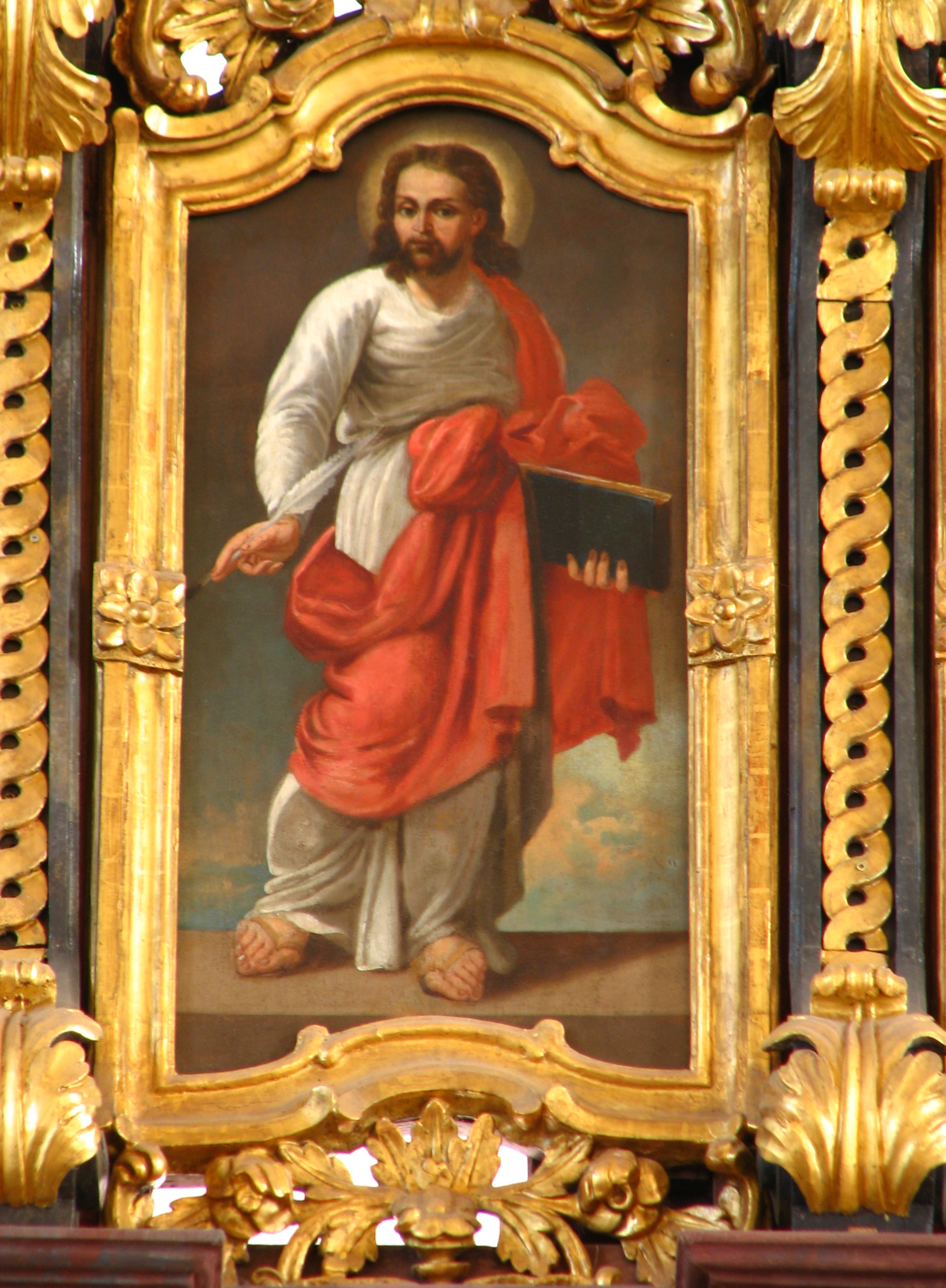
Mark the Evangelist

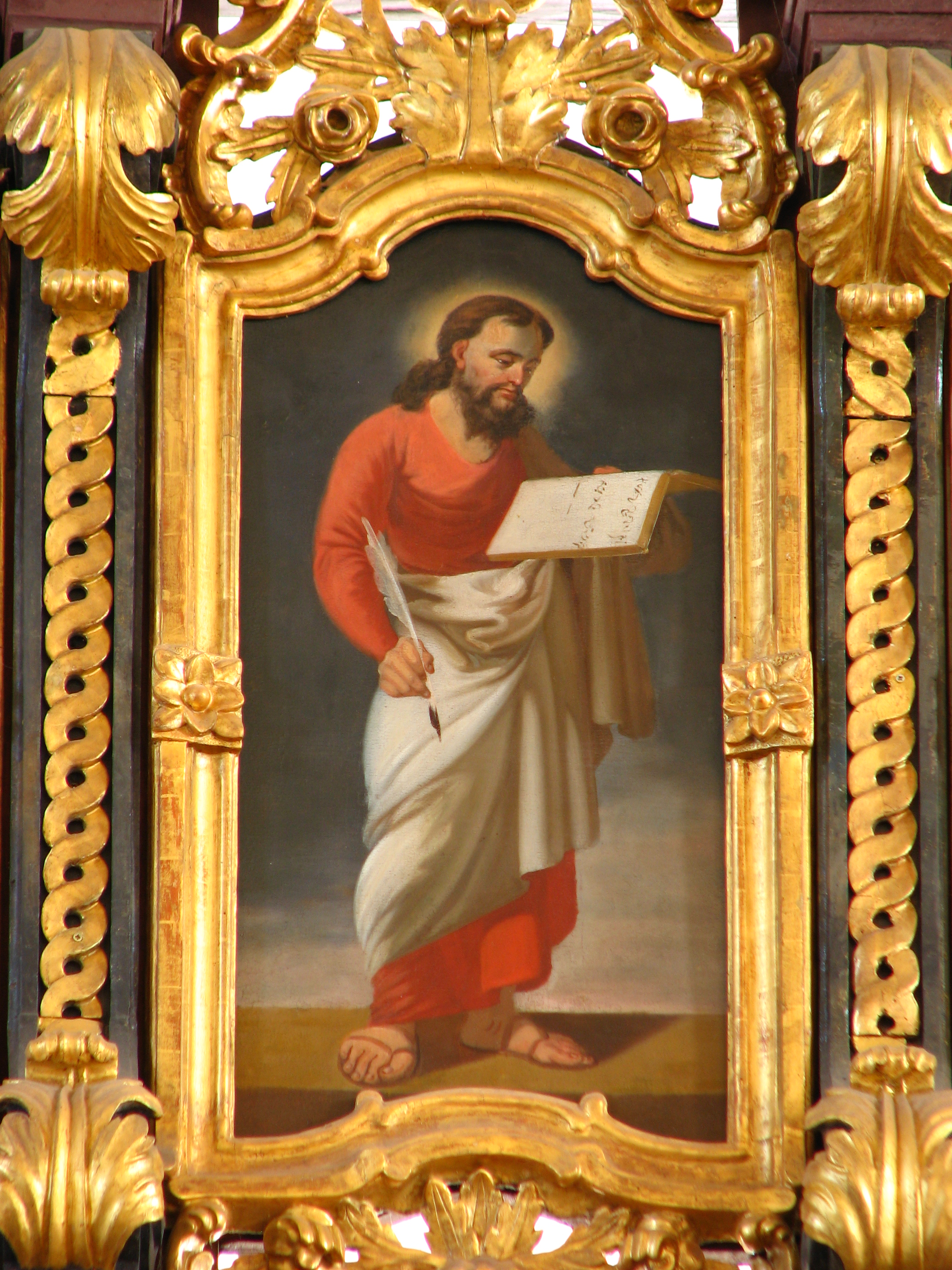
Matthew the Evangelist

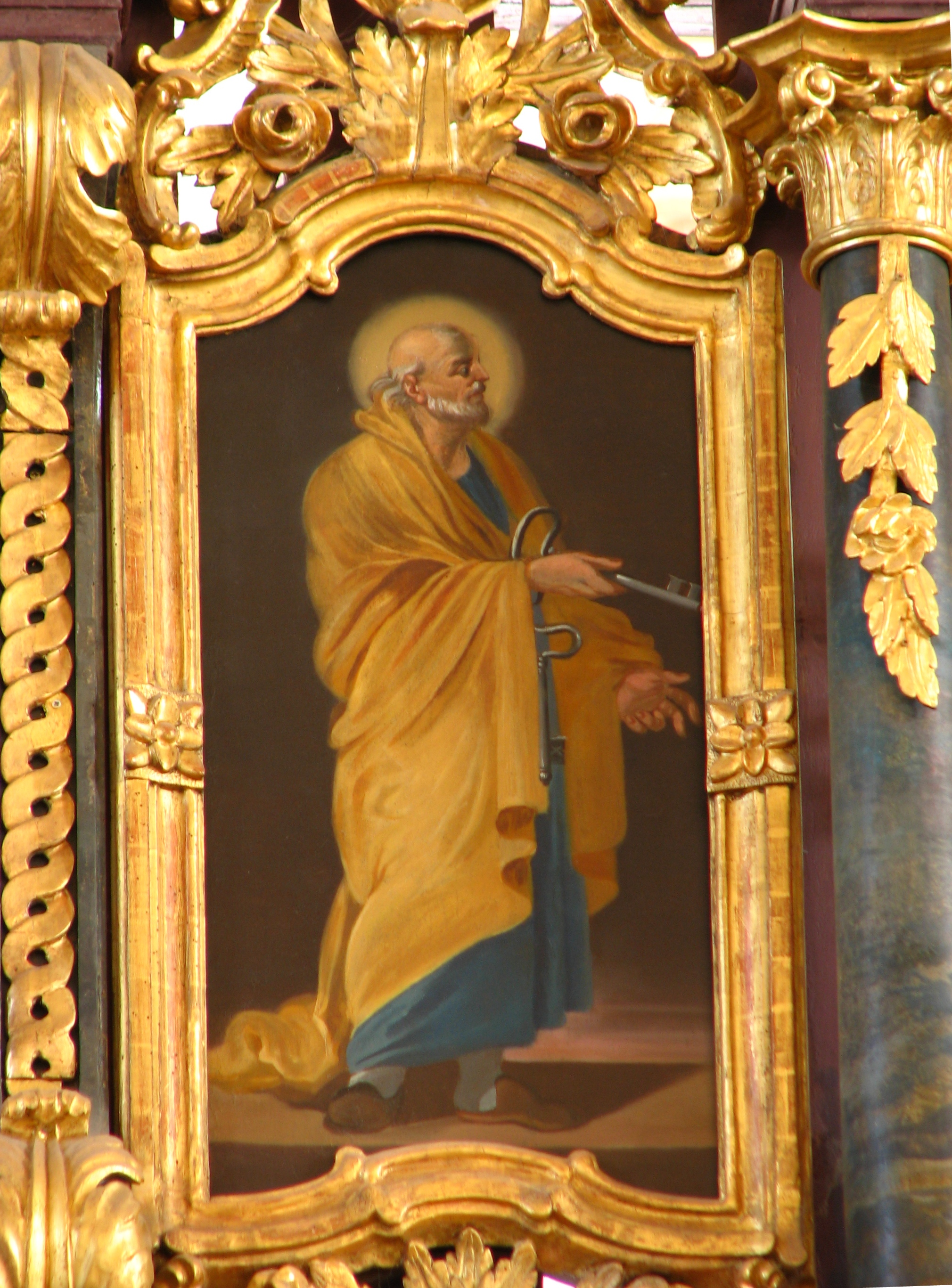
Peter

Paul's icon continues the Apostles tier on the right side. He was not one of the twelve disciples of Jesus; Paul, a Roman citizen, was arrested in Jerusalem because he was accused of preaching against the Jewish law and traditions. However, as a Roman citizen by birth, he exercised his right to appeal to Caesar. He was brought to Rome, and after six years' imprisonment, the curia sentenced him to death. Considering his Roman status, they chose the most pious way to execute him: Paul was beheaded with a sword according to tradition. This is the reason he is shown with a sword in his right hand. In his left hand he holds his epistles from the New Testament. The next icon portrays John. He has his own gospel in his left hand. Legend has it that John was the only apostle who was not martyred as he died after a long life in Ephesus. Nevertheless, he was unable to escape persecution and had to defend his faith before Domitian. The emperor told him that he should prove the strength of his God with deeds and not just words. John asked for a cup of poisoned wine that he blessed and then drank; the strength of his faith protected him and he remained unharmed. The empty chalice on his gospel is symbolic of this miracle. Luke the Evangelist appears in the next image. As in the icons of Mark and Matthew, he holds a quill and his gospel. The icon of James the Elder follows Luke's image. He was painted with a pilgrim's staff, holding a pack and a letter of pilgrimage in his right hand. James was John's brother, and he was beheaded in Judea in 44 AD. His relics were translated to Spain, where one of the first pilgrimage sites in Europe was born to venerate him. The Camino de Santiago leads to his shrine. Simon's icon is the next on the tier; he preached the Word in Egypt, and he was martyred in Armenia. Simon was put to death by a saw and is portrayed with the symbol of his martyrdom. The last image on the Apostles tier depicts Philip. He lived and spread Jesus' teachings in today's Turkey, and according to Christian traditions he was crucified upside-down. He holds a Latin Cross to commemorate his martyrdom.

Apostles tier
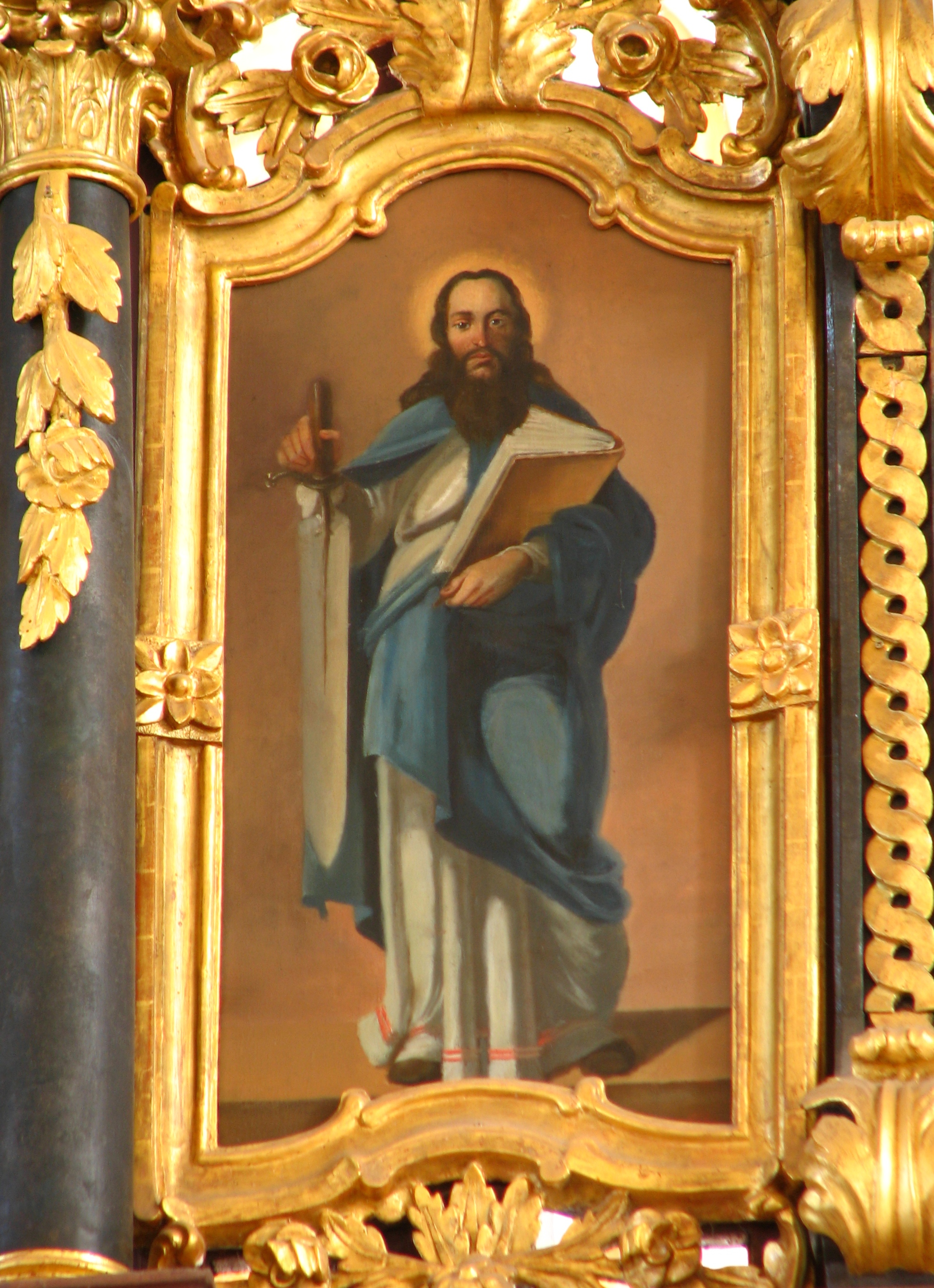
Paul

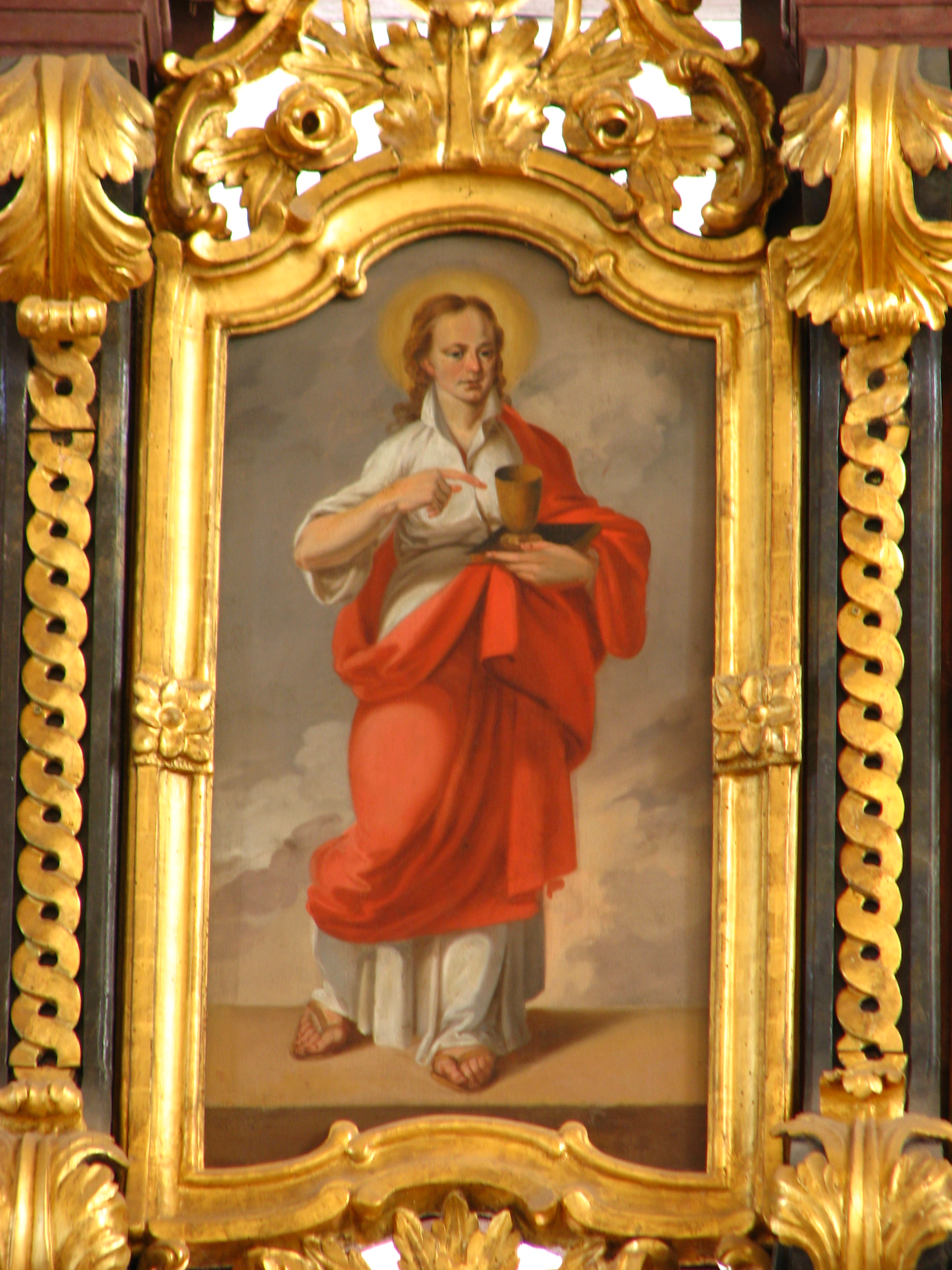
John

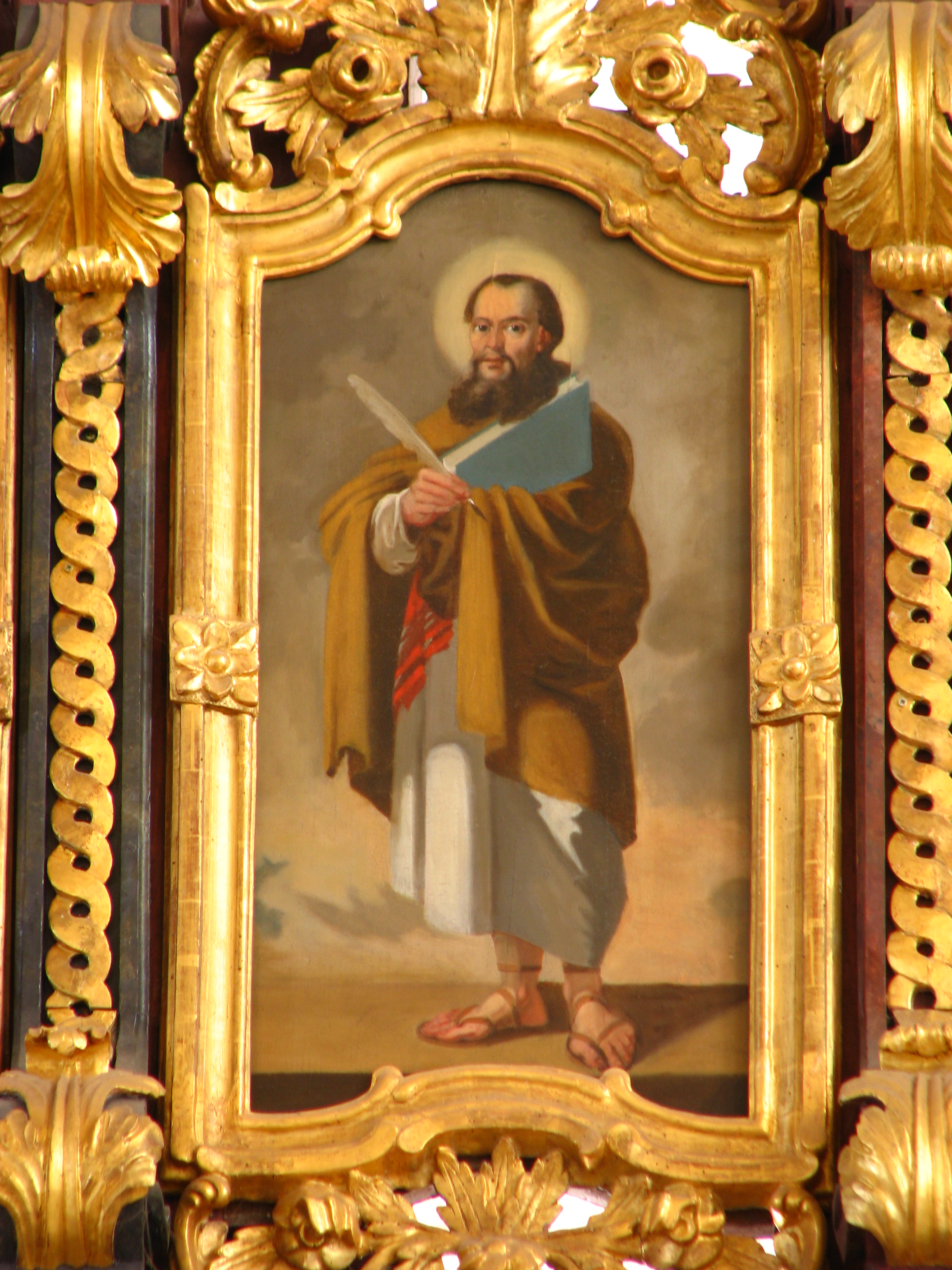
Luke the Evangelist

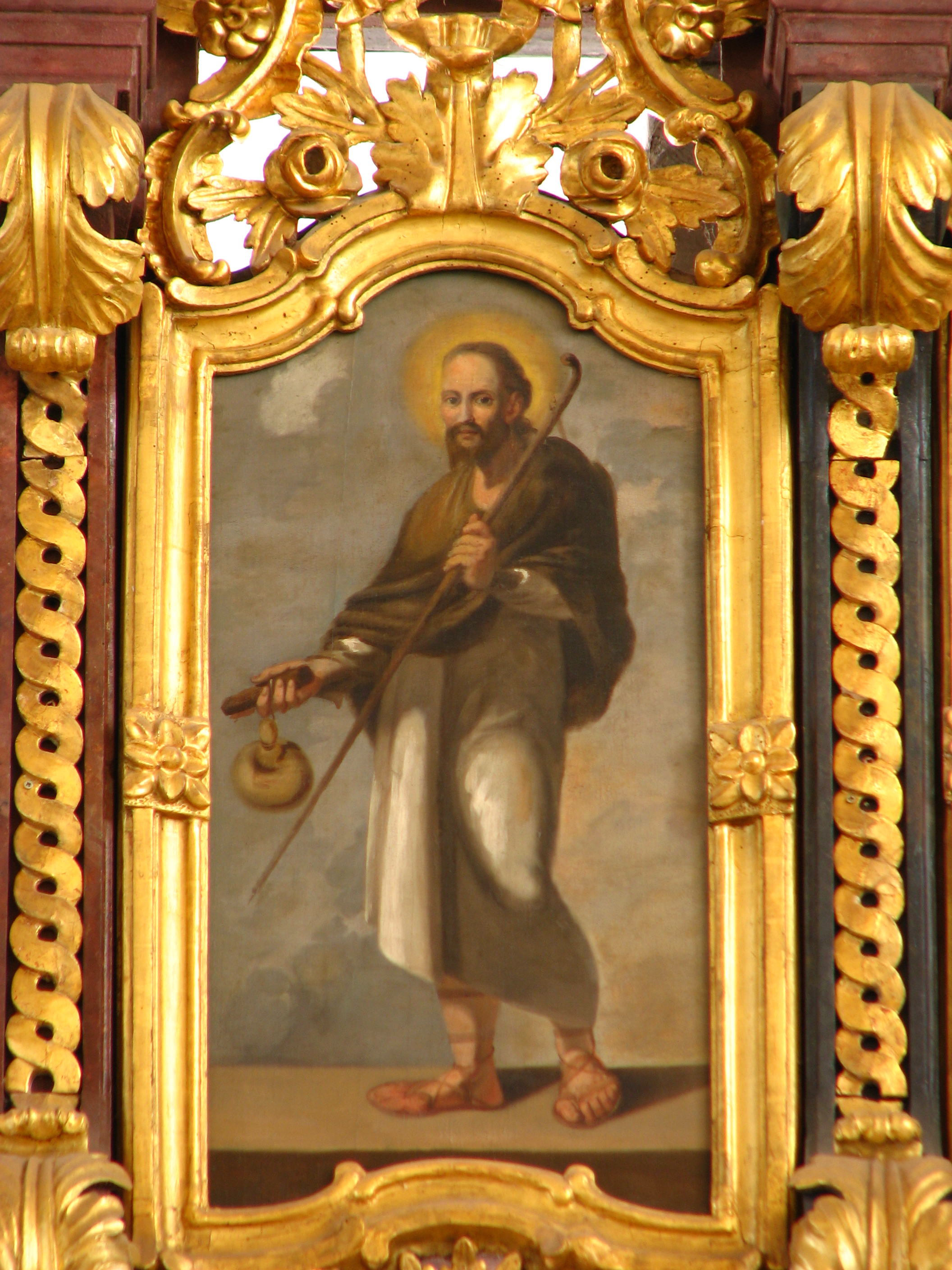
James the Elder

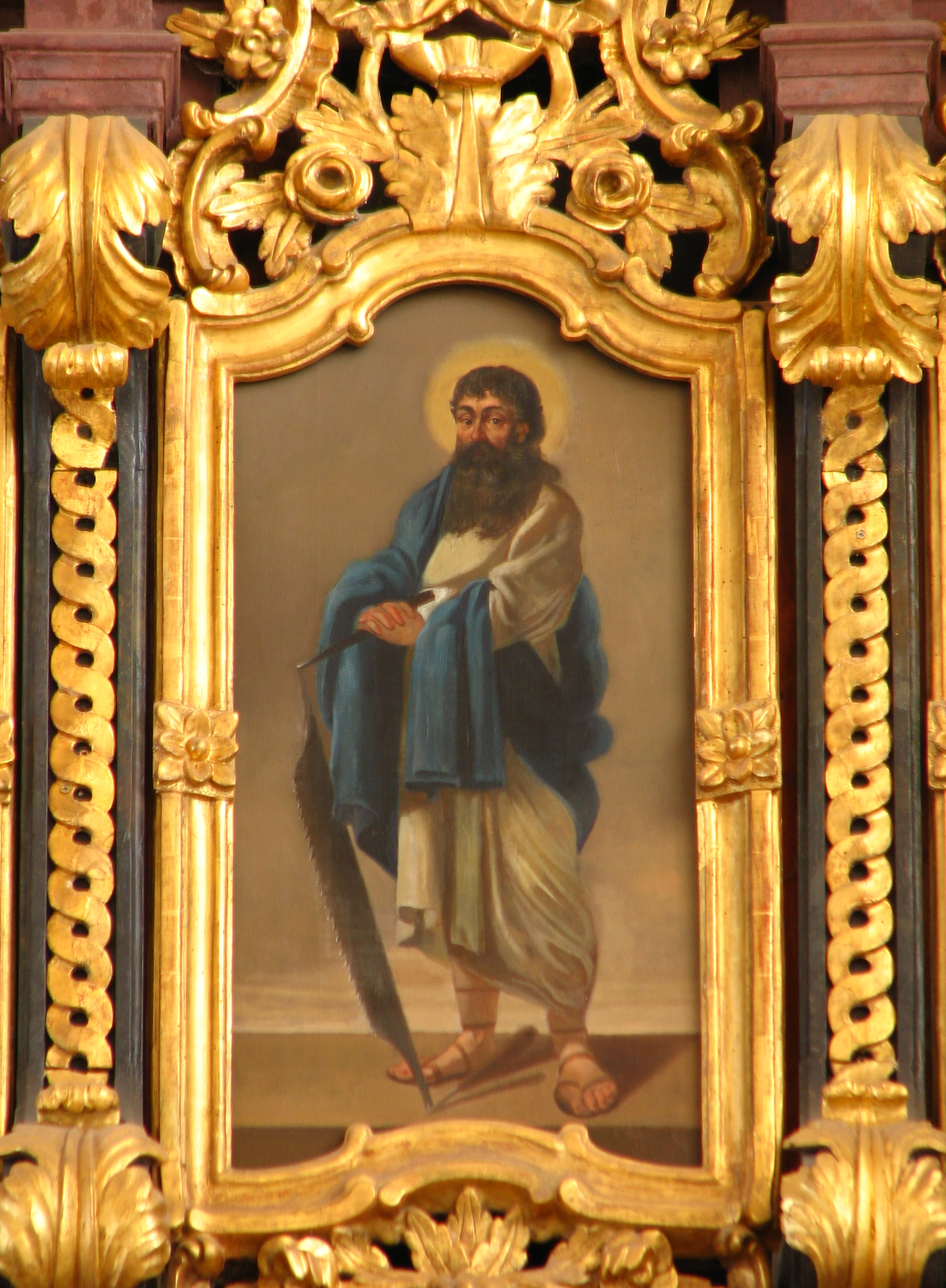
Simon

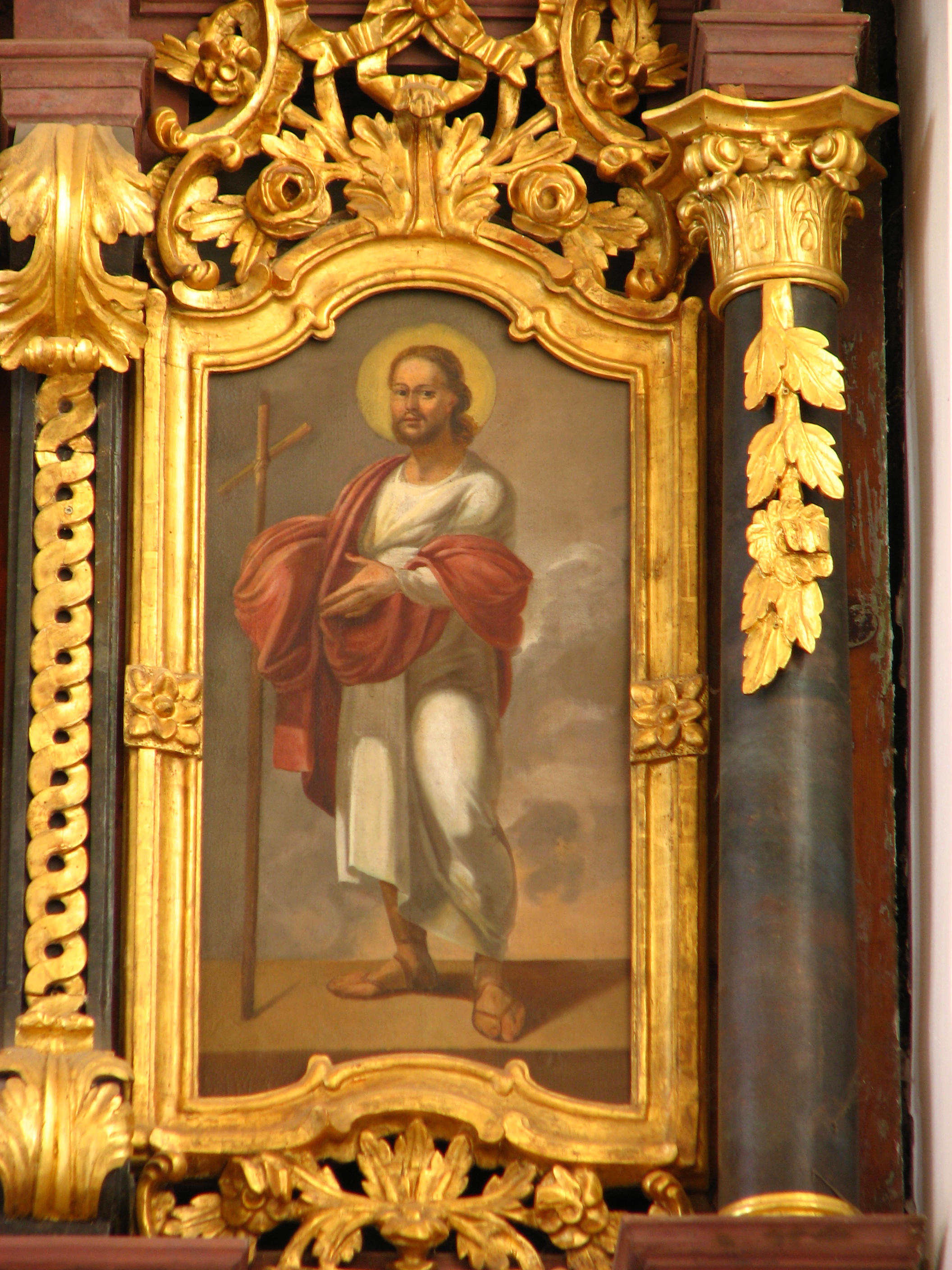
Philip

Old Testament prophets and patriarchs are portrayed on the fourth tier of the iconostasis, in accordance with the traditional Slavic structure. Three of the twelve Biblical figures in the row are hard to identify because they do not hold any emblems, nor do they have their names painted on the icon. However, the placement of the icons is rather strictly regulated, determining whom the three icons can portray. The first painting from the left is one of the three uncertain icons. Most probably it depicts Daniel as a youth. He holds a rock in his hand as described in one of his visions in Daniel 2. He could interpret the dream of Nebuchadnezzar, king of Babylonia, prophesying the fall of the great empires. In the king's dream, the strong empires, symbolized by a terrifying creature, were smashed by a rock. The next picture portrays Zechariah, the eleventh of the Twelve Minor Prophets, who led his people as a priest. He is depicted in a high priest's vestments holding a seven-branched menorah. Ezekiel's image is the third on the tier. He points to a "closed gate" with his right hand in accordance with one of his prophecies. Christian scholars interpreted this narrative later as the Old Testament reference to the Incarnation, to the birth of Jesus. The gate that can only be opened by God signifies Mary and the prince symbolizes Jesus. The next icon portrays David, the second king of the united Israel. He is depicted with the harp he played to expel the evil spirit possessing King Saul. David is followed by Jacob, holding his ladder. According to the Old Testament Jacob dreamed about a ladder reaching into heaven with angels going up and down it. In Christian theology the ladder can stand for Jesus himself, bridging the gap between Heaven and Earth. The last prophet on the left side of the tier is Moses. He holds the Tablets of Stone on which the Ten Commandments are inscribed. The painters included two horn-like curls of hair on Moses' head as on Michelangelo's well-known statue.

Prophets tier
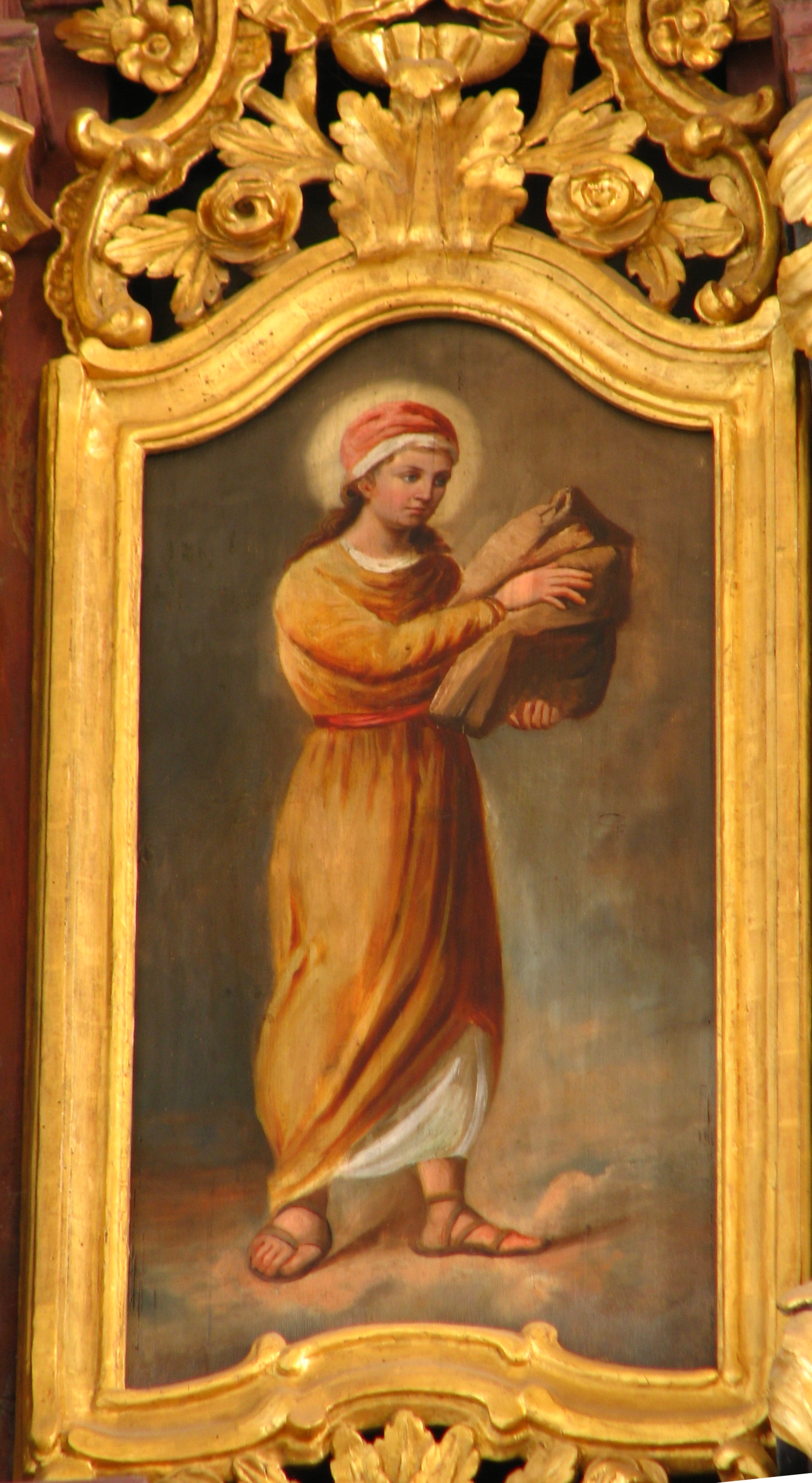
Daniel

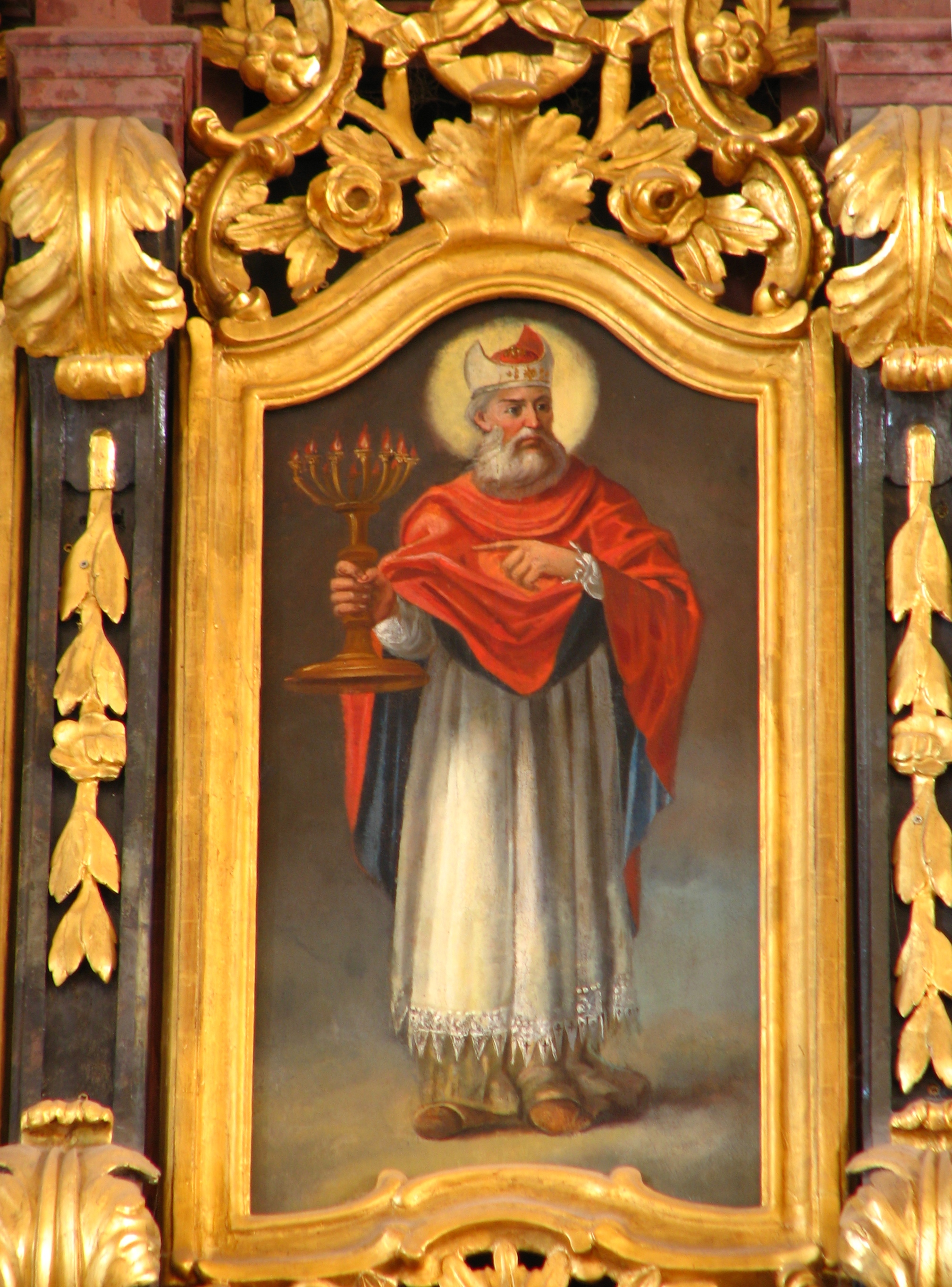
Zechariah

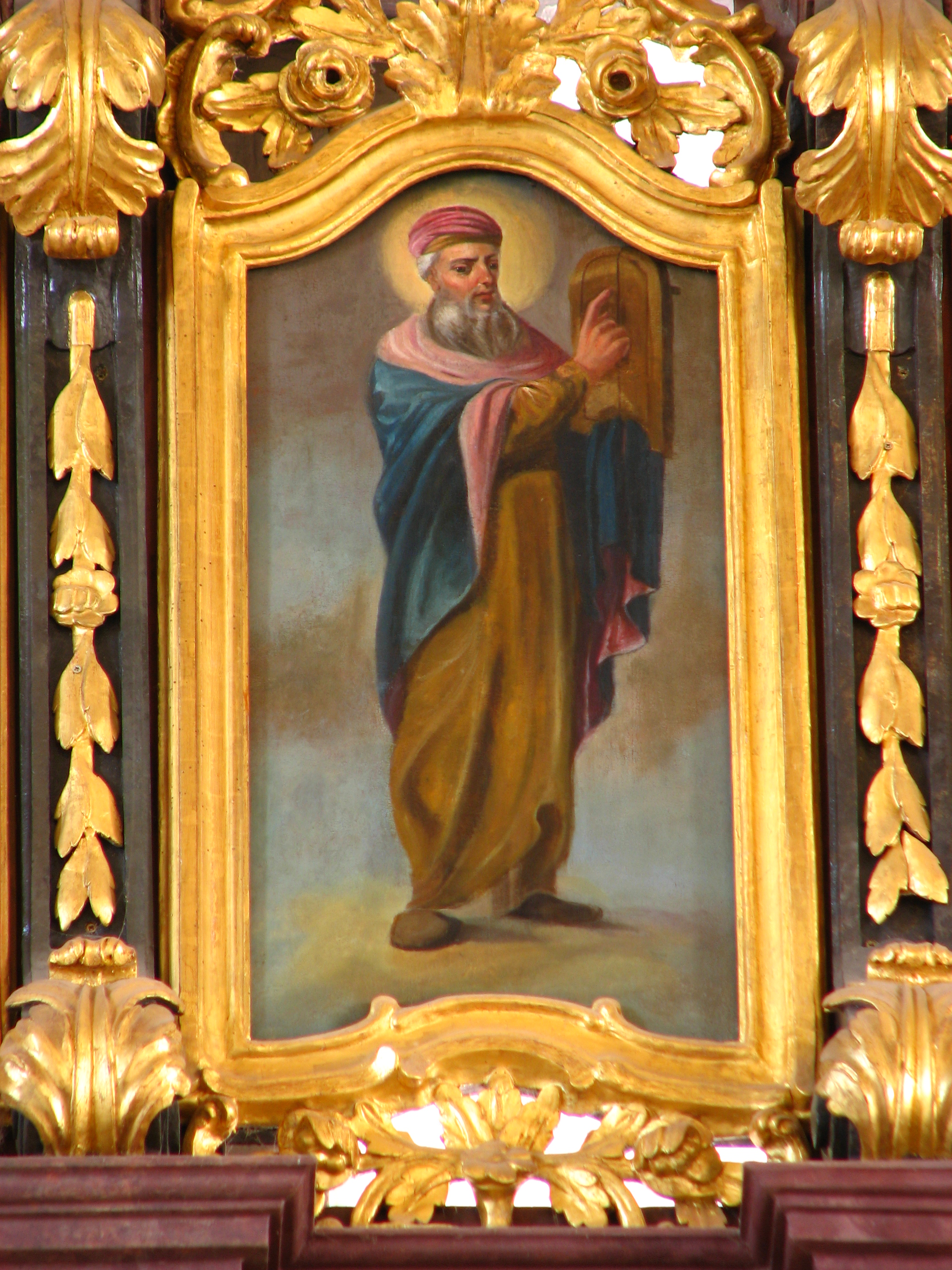
Ezekiel

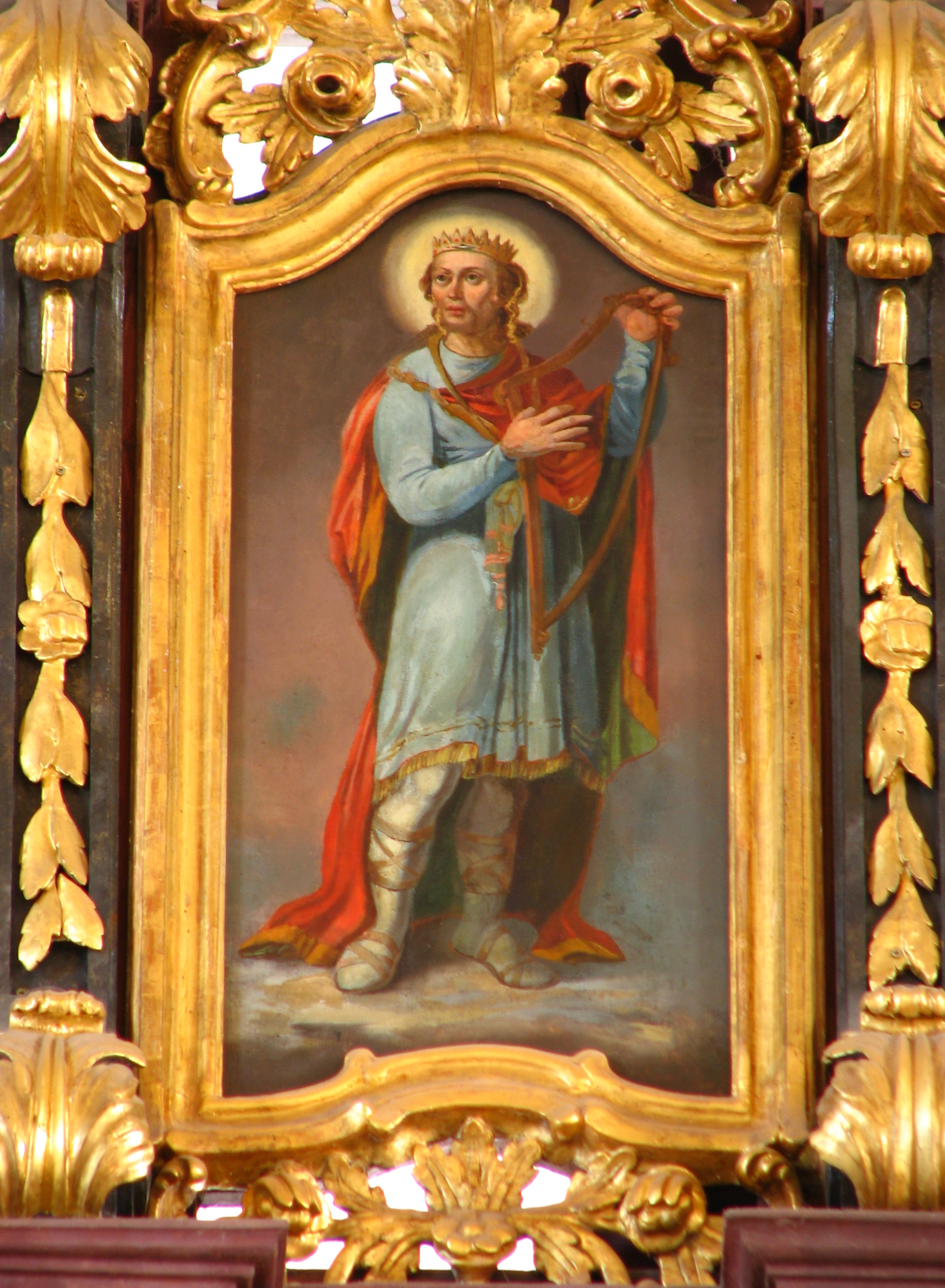
King David

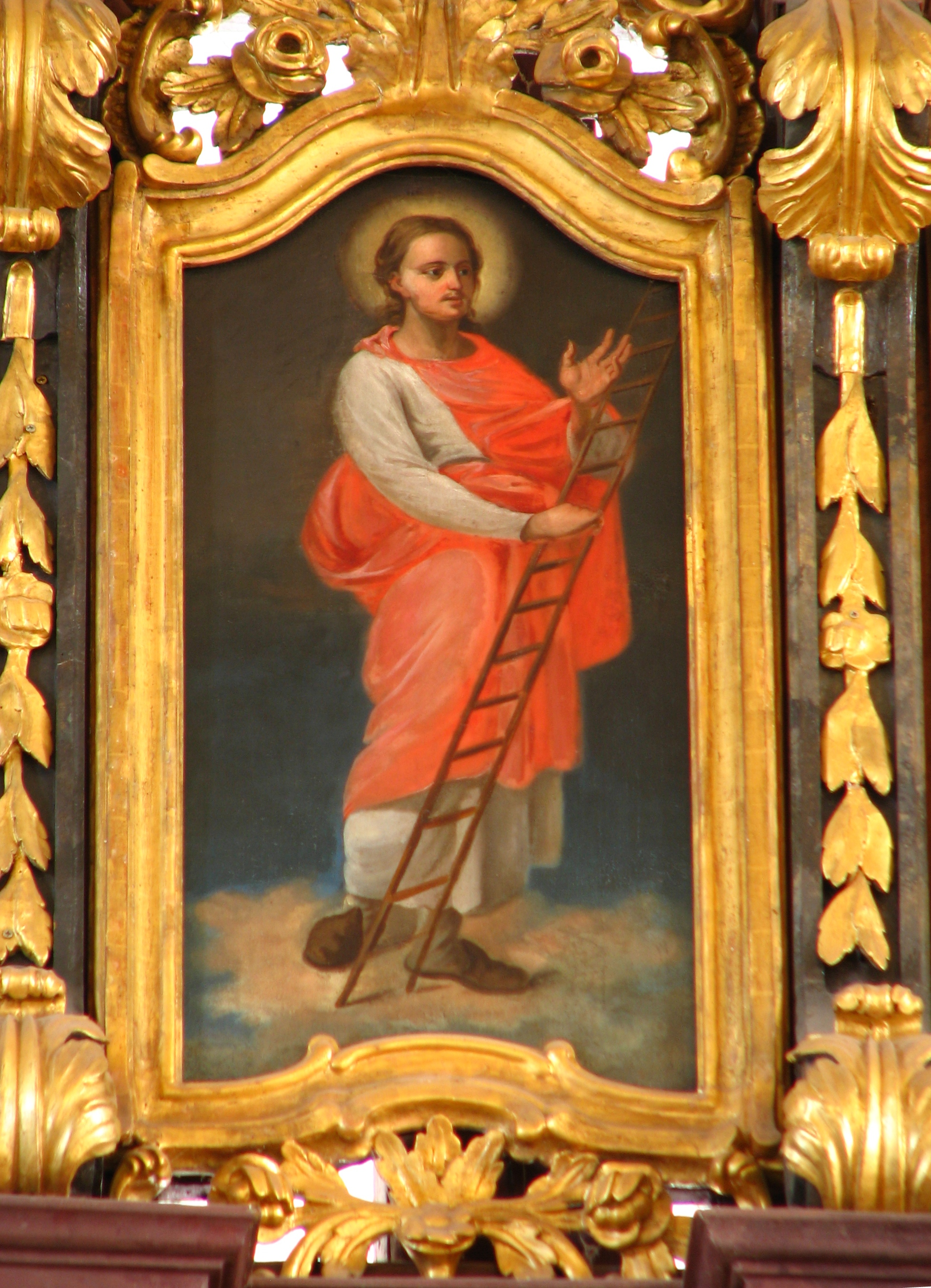
Jacob

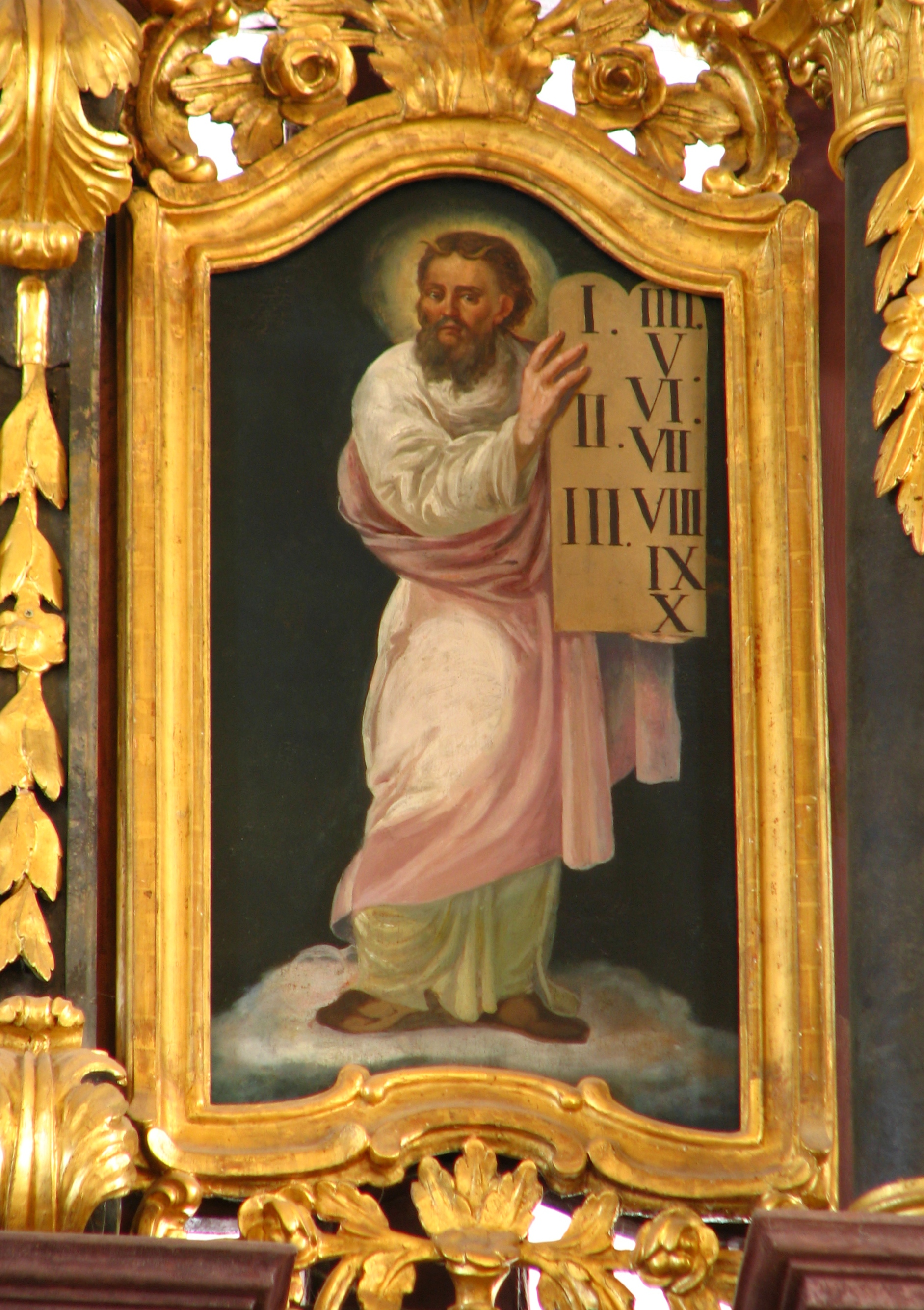
Moses

Aaron, the brother of Moses, is on the first icon on the right side of the tier. He represented the priestly functions of his tribe, becoming the first High Priest of the Israelites. In his right hand he holds a crosier decorated with flowers, and a thurible in his left. The next image depicts Gideon, one of the judges of Israel, with a fleece. In the Old Testament, an angel appeared to Gideon, telling him that he would save his tribe from the invading Midianites. Gideon asked for proof of God's message; he laid a fleece of wool on the ground and asked the Lord to make the fleece wet and keep the ground dry by next morning, if the victory were to be his. Next morning the fleece was wet and the ground was dry; Gideon demanded a second test in which the fleece should remain dry while dew covered the rest of the ground and this also happened. Later this narrative was understood as a reference to Jesus' birth. In these explanations the fleece stood for Mary, and the dew signified Christ. King Solomon is portrayed on the next icon. He was the son of King David, and he holds an image signifying the First Temple of Jerusalem. The Old Testament credits Solomon with its completion. Another unidentified icon stands close to Solomon's painting. The aged man reaching for the sky is probably Jeremiah, son of a landowner. In the Bible Jeremiah was chosen to prophesy God's anger at the Israelites who worshiped idols. He had to prepare his people for the fall of Jerusalem and for being enslaved. Knowing the fate of his tribe he is usually depicted as an old, worn man looking up to the skies, praying for God's forgiveness. The next icon shows a traditional depiction of Isaiah, in which an angel touches his lips. According to the iconographical traditions the angel fills Isaiah's lips with fire to preach his prophecies without fear. In another interpretation the fire refers to the Book of Isaiah, in which he mentions the burning anger of God. The last icon on the Prophets tier depicts a young man wearing a turban. It is the last uncertain icon in the row, probably portraying Habakkuk. He holds a package containing the stew he took for Daniel when he was in the lion's den with the help of an angel.

Prophets tier
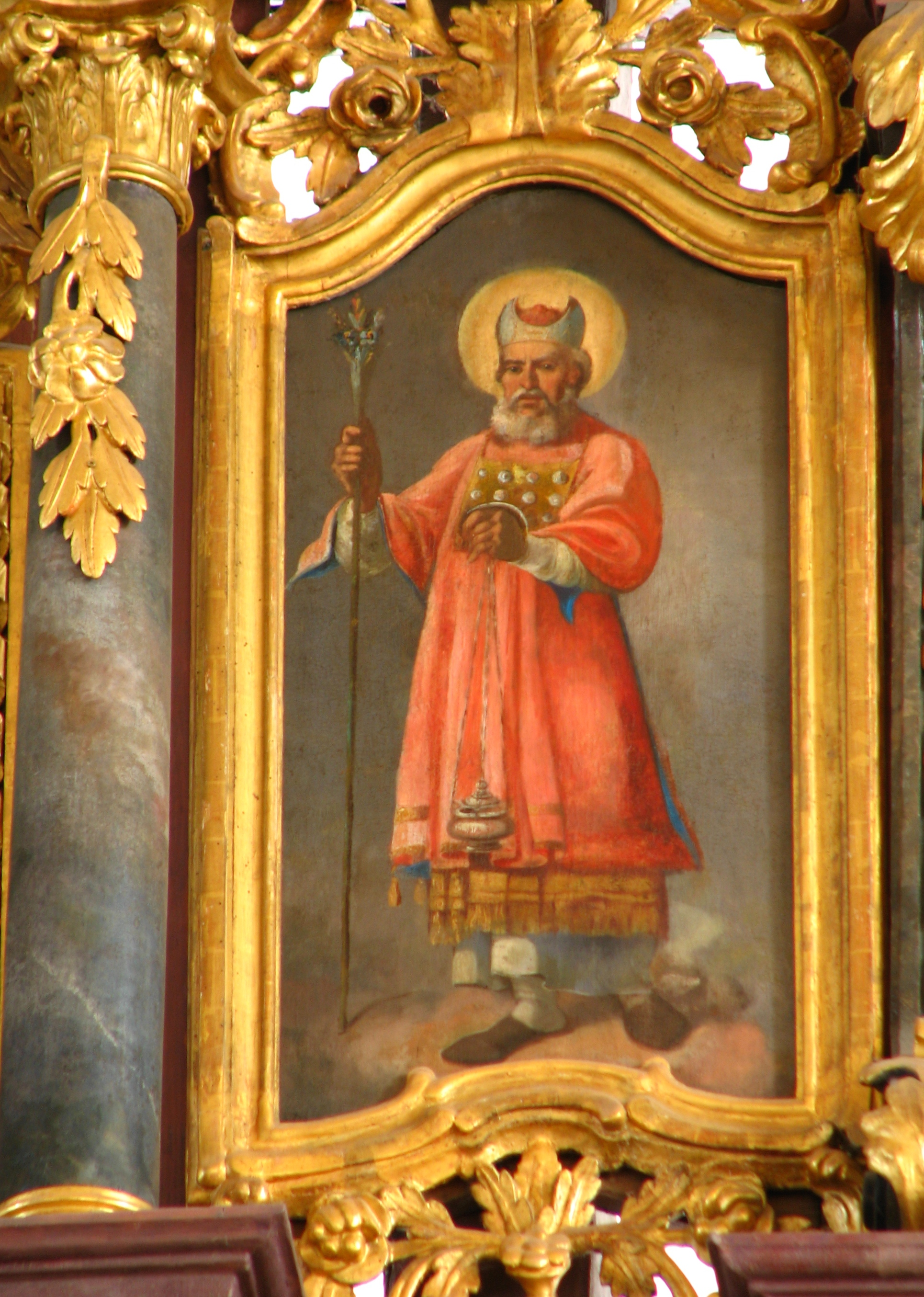
Aaron

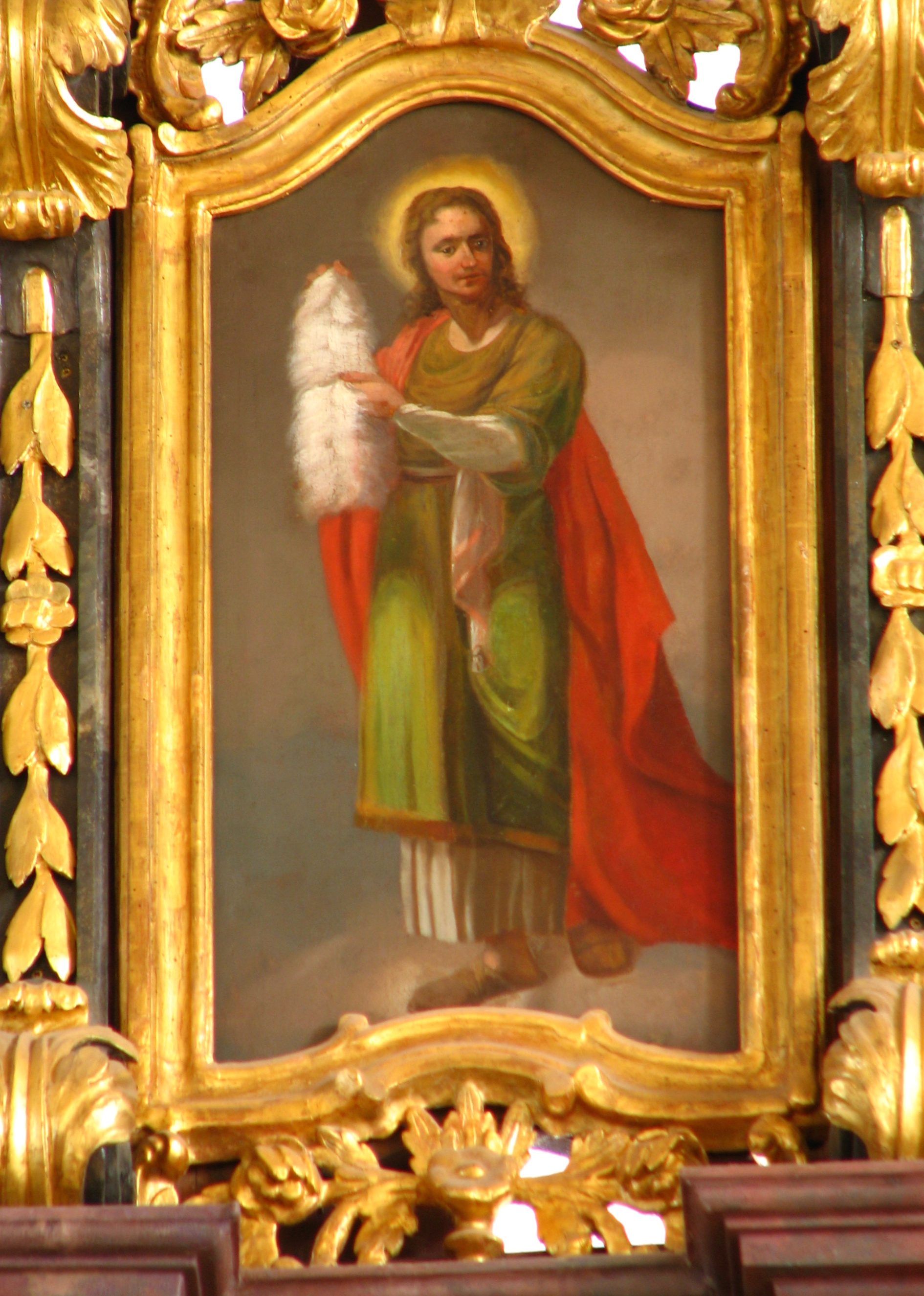
Gideon

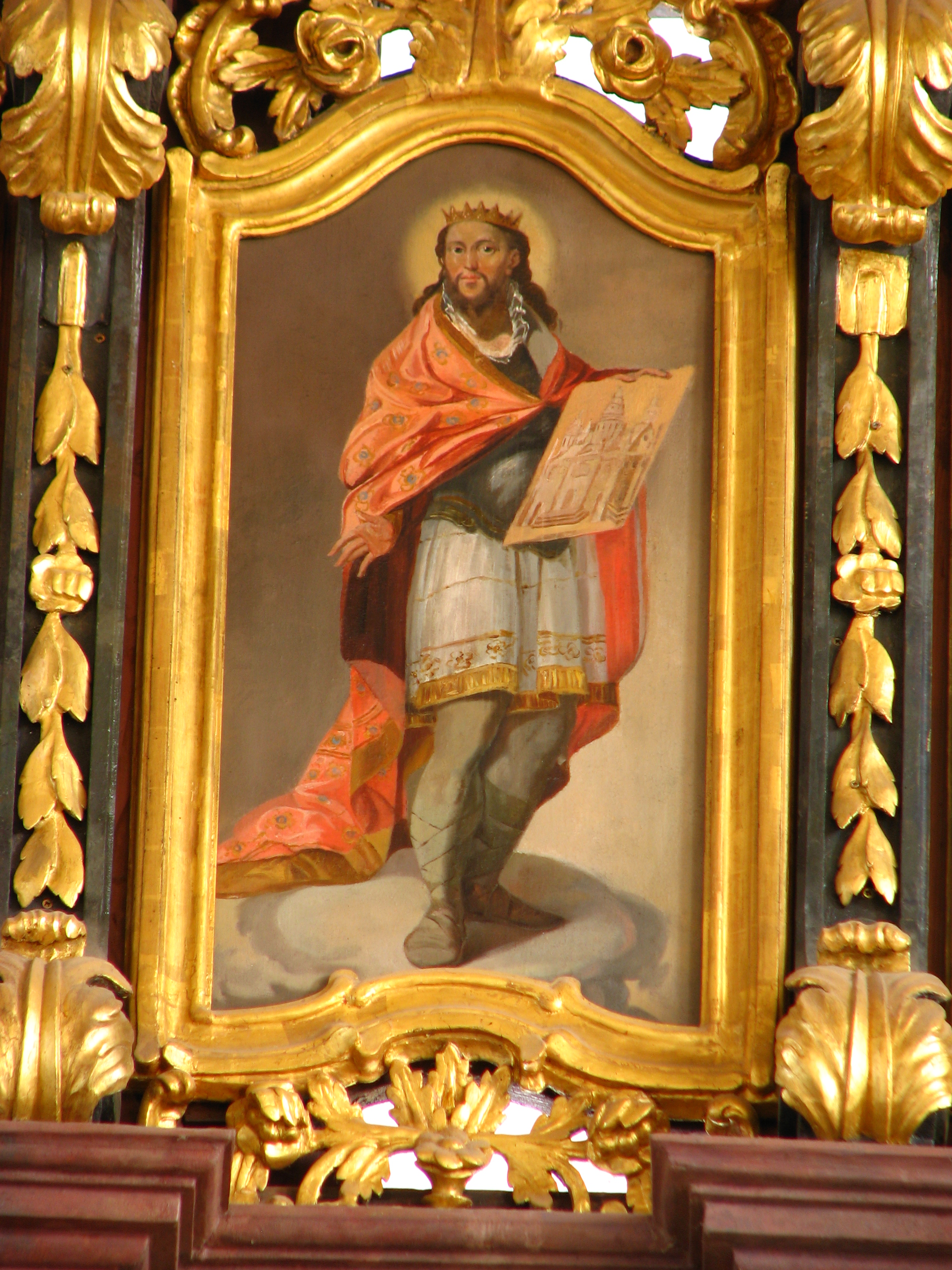
King Solomon

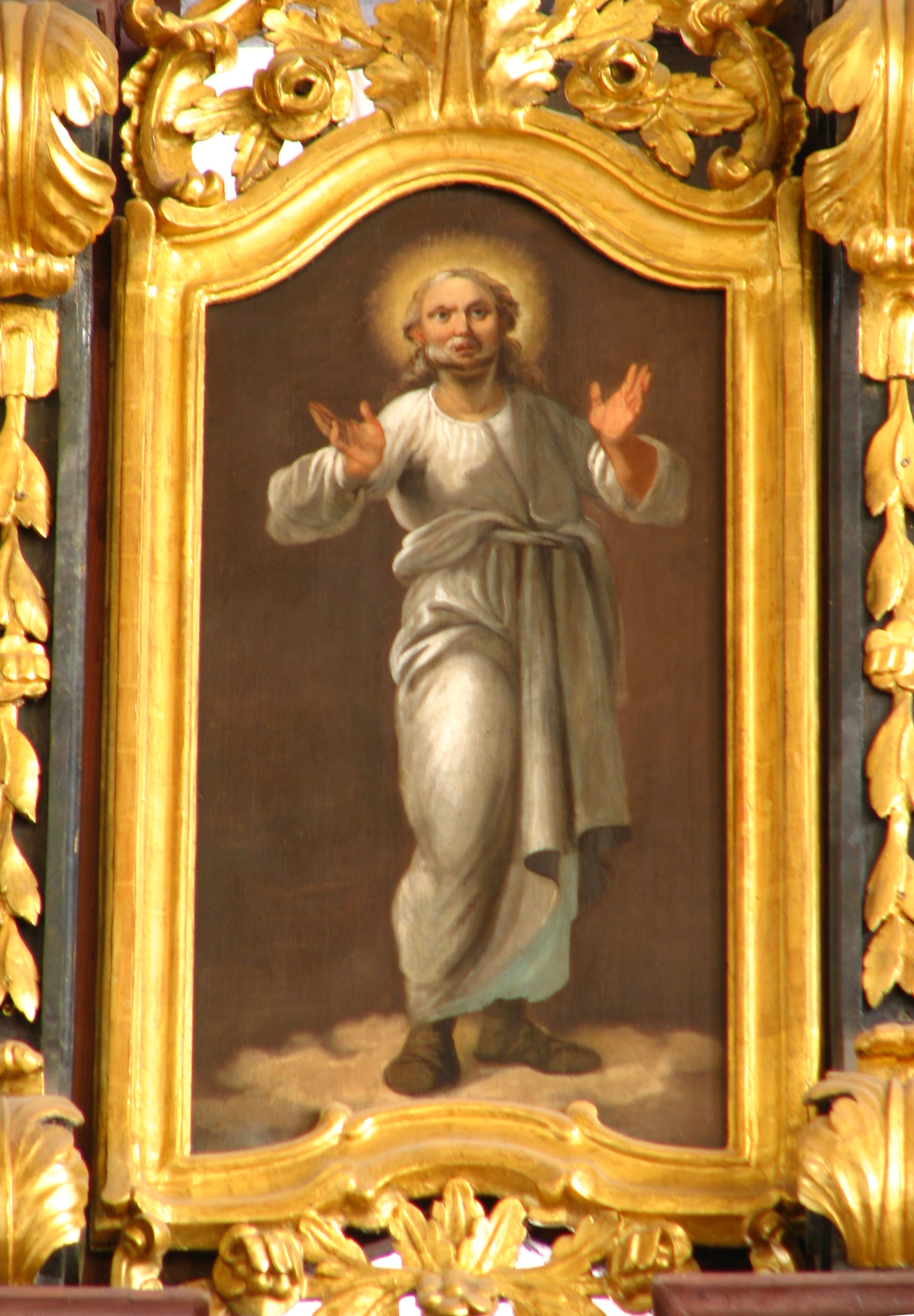
Jeremiah

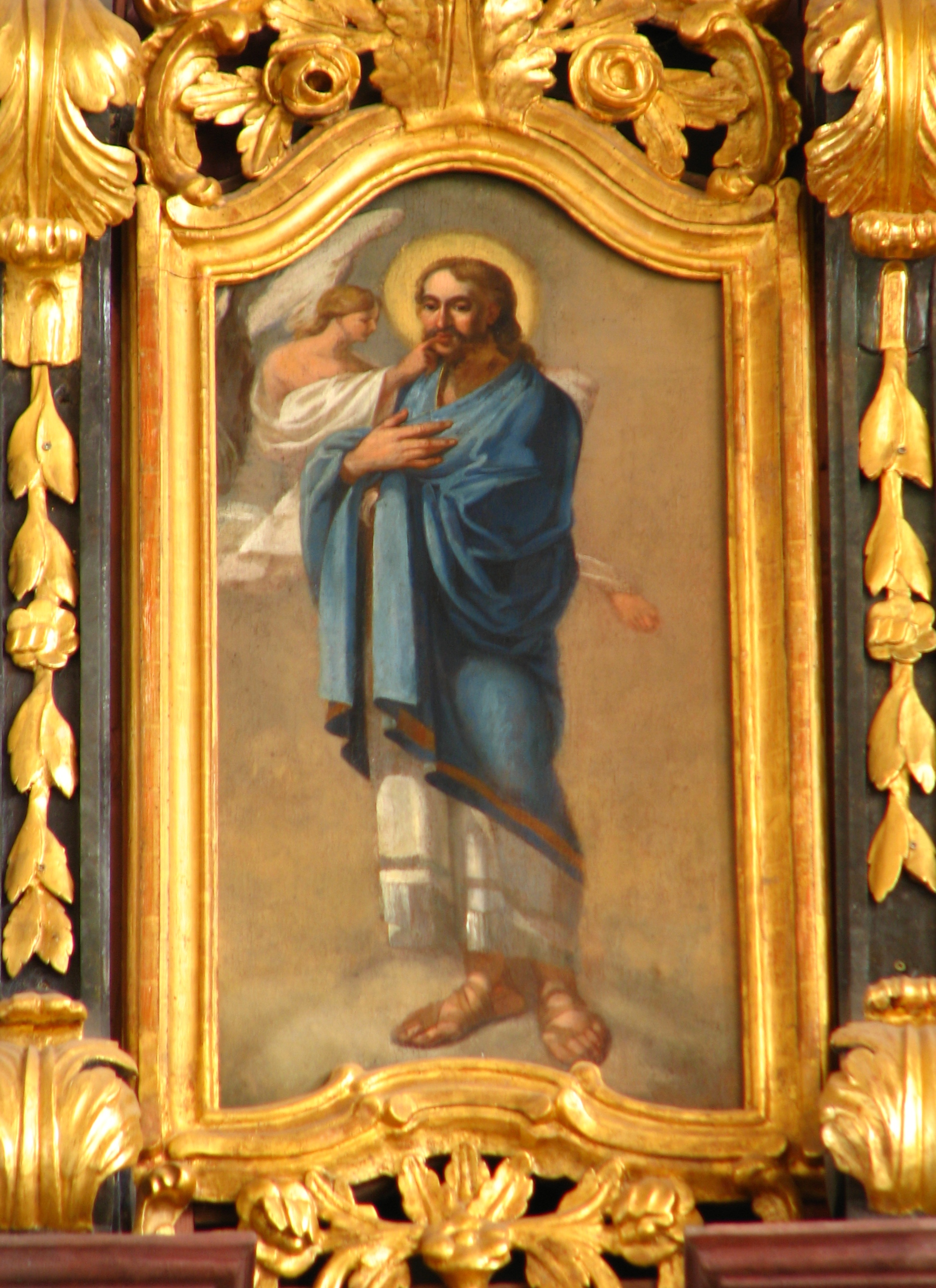
Isaiah

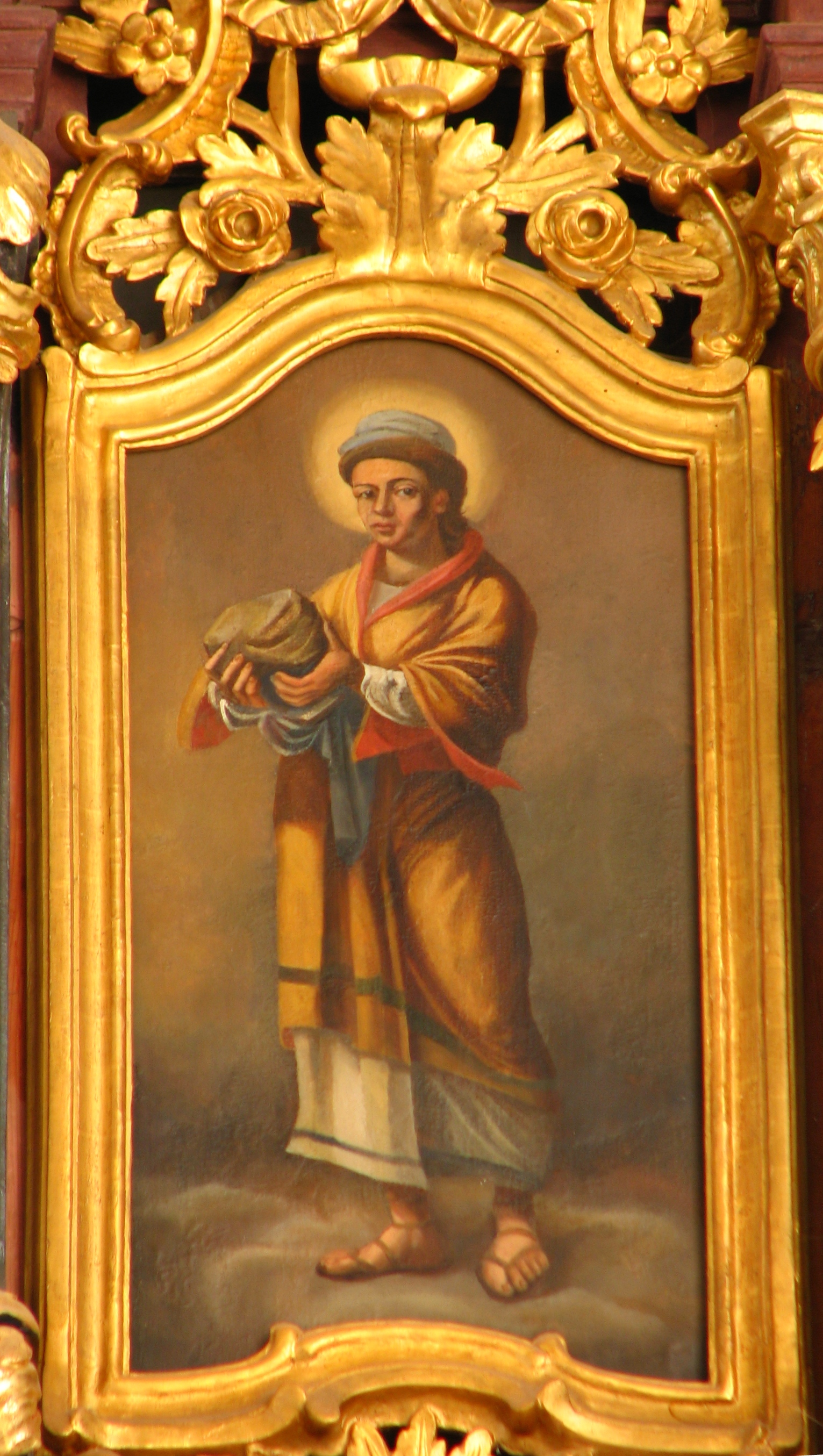
Habakkuk

The Feasts, Apostles and Prophets tiers are divided by two large icons in the middle. One of them is the Christ in Majesty situated directly above the Royal Door. At the start of the latest restoration this icon was in rather poor condition: the oil paint was peeling off and it was heavily infested by woodworm. The Christ in Majesty icon, as in that of the Pantocrator, is a traditional depiction of Jesus. Christ is seated on a throne as ruler of the world, wearing episcopal vestments. He makes the teaching gesture with his right hand, and he holds the Bible in his left, opened at the New Testament: "Come, you who are blessed by my Father; take your inheritance, the kingdom prepared for you since the creation of the world" (Matthew 25:34). According to the Bible these are the words, Jesus will say for those who believe in him. This depiction is more popular in Western Christianity. Eastern Orthodoxy traditionally uses the so-called "Deesis" composition on iconostases. The Deesis illustrates the enthroned Christ entreated by Mary and John the Baptist. The Resurrection of Jesus was painted on the icon above the Christ in Majesty. It depicts the scene of the opening of the holy tomb, from which Jesus is ascending, with his five wounds on his hands, feet and chest. Four Roman soldiers, guarding the entrance of the tomb, witness the miracle of the resurrection.
The iconostasis is topped by the three icons of the Calvary scene. In the centre, above the Eye of Providence, is the icon of the crucified Jesus. The restorers added the letters JKZsK (abbreviation of Jesus Christ, King of the Jews, in Hungarian: Jézus Krisztus a Zsidók Királya) to the upper arm of the cross-shaped icon during the renovation works in the 1870s. The main purpose of the latest restoration was to restore the iconostasis to its original condition as far as possible. As a result, the lettering was removed in 2002. The large icon of Mary is on the right side of the cross, and Saint John the Apostle stands on its left.

The two central icons and the Calvary scene
Christ in Majesty

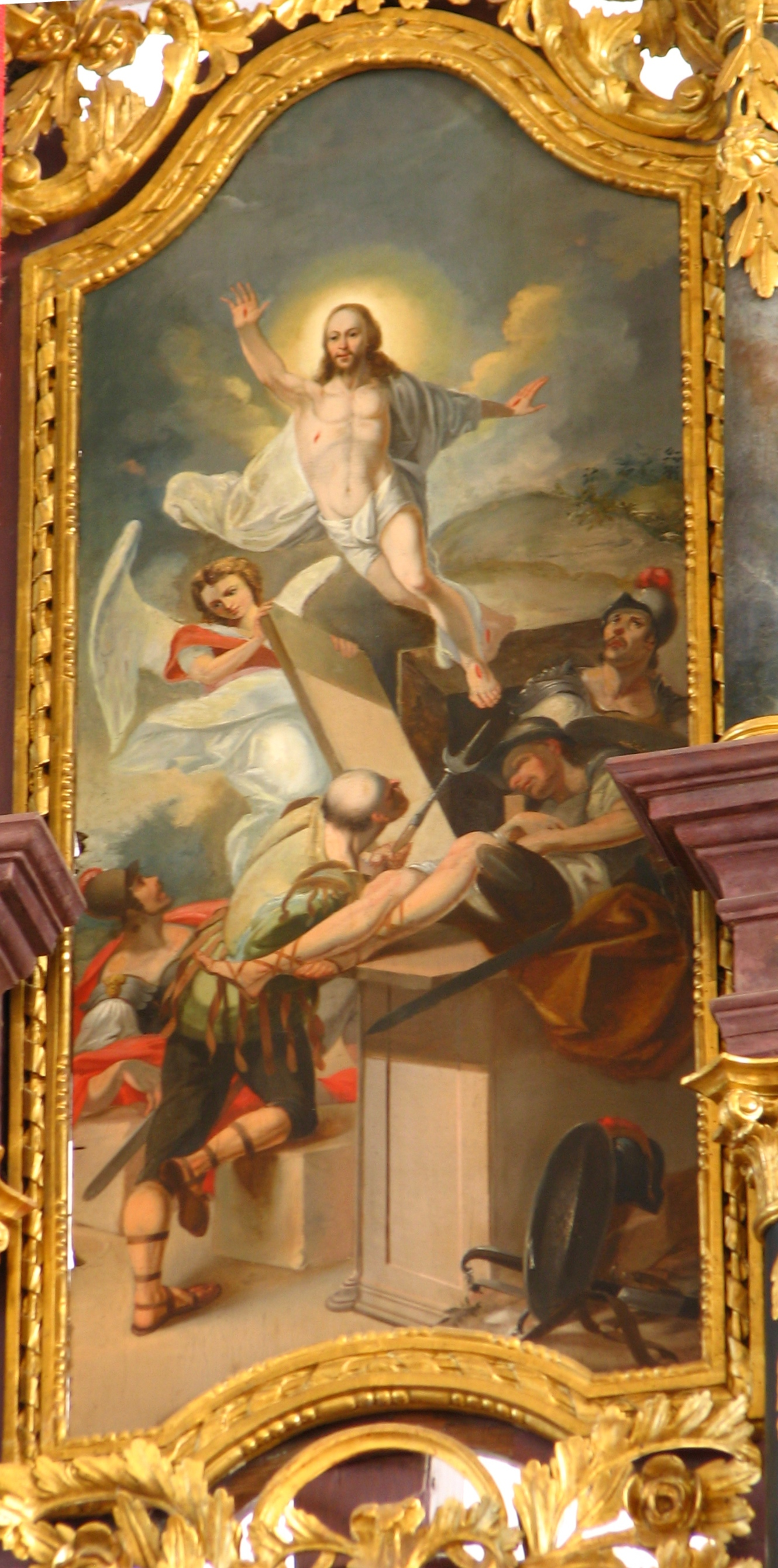
Resurrection of Jesus

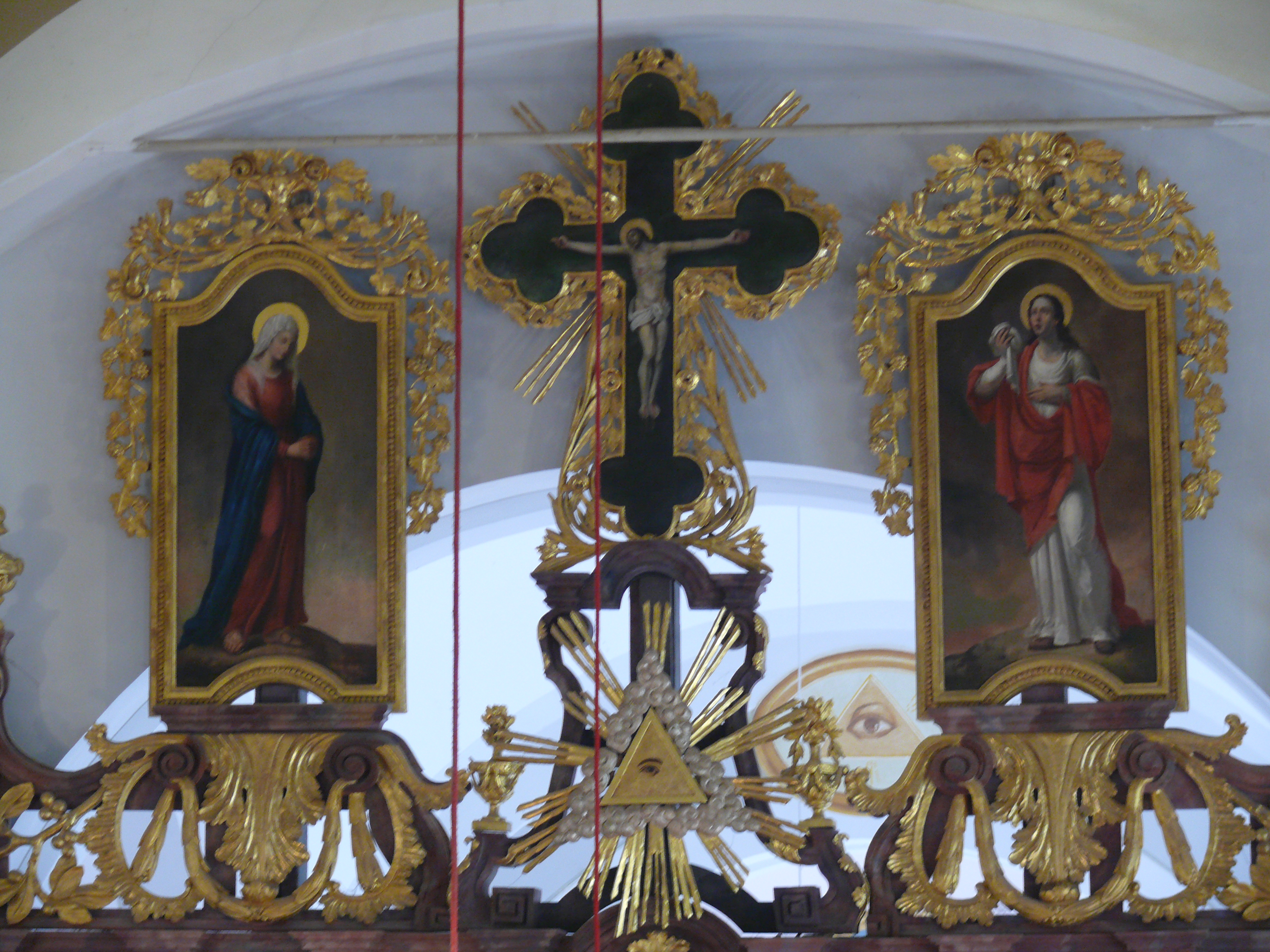
Calvary scene

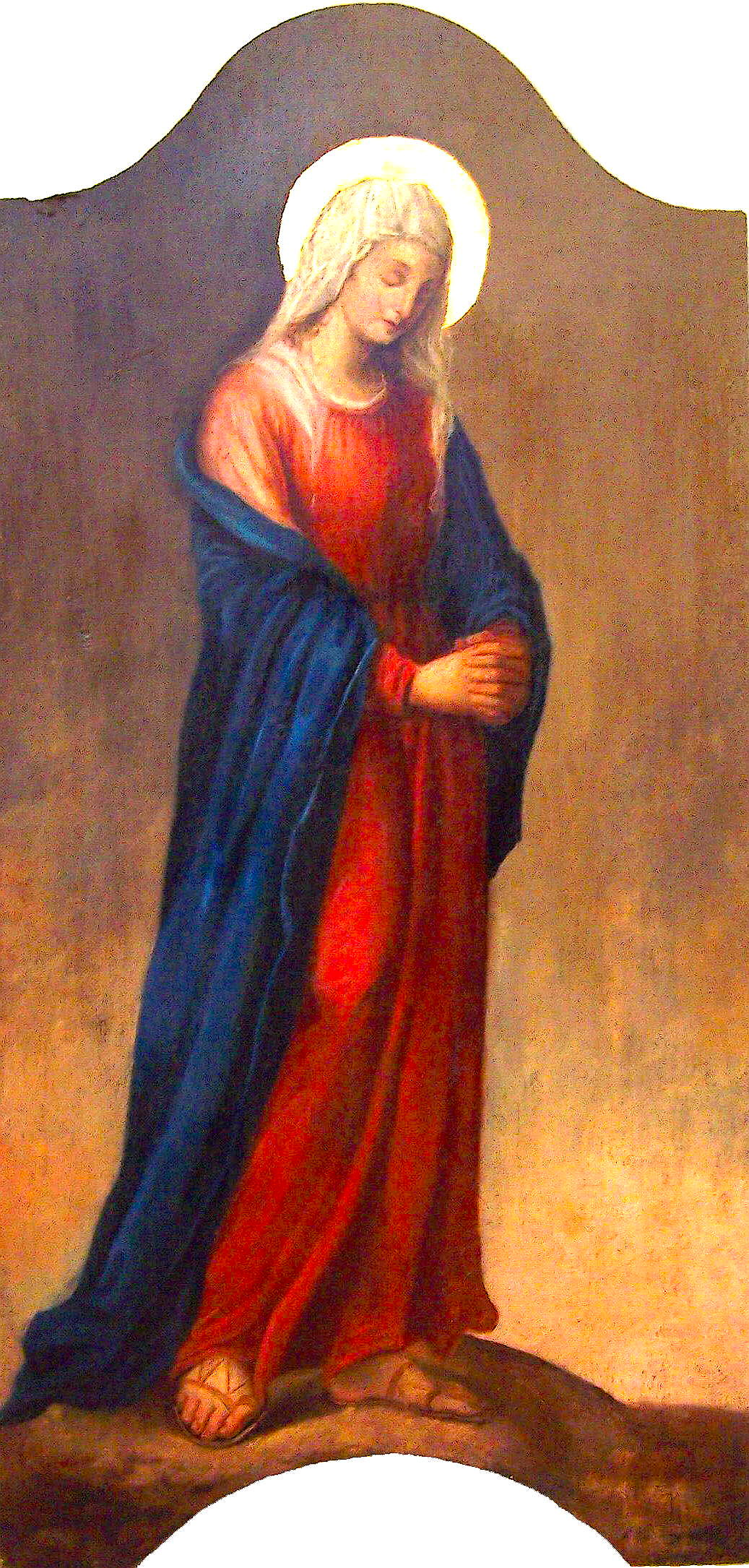
Mary

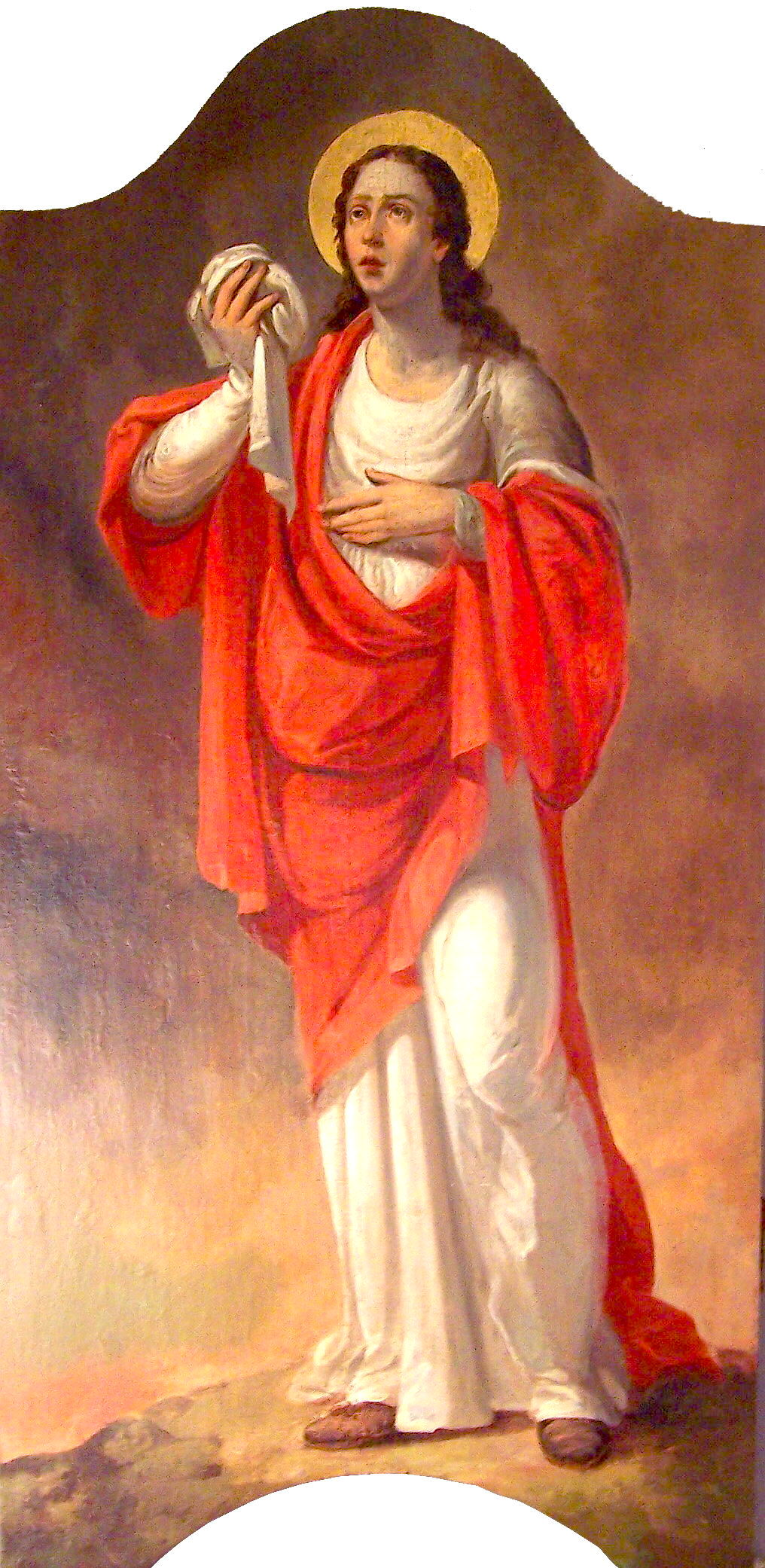
John the Apostle

== Bibliography ==
Primary sources

- Terdik Szilveszter (2010-09-03). "A hajdúdorogi ikonosztázionról". Byzantinohungarica. Archived from the original on 2013-12-19.
- Deák, Klára (1992). Főrestaurátori szakvélemény a hajdúdorogi görög katolikus templom ikonosztázáról. Budapest.
- Sz. Kürti, Katalin (1989). Hajdúdorog, Görög Katolikus Székesegyház; a Tájak Korok Múzeumok Kiskönyvtára c. sorozat 329. száma. Veszprém: TKM Egyesület. ISBN 963-555-604-7.
- Károlyi Györgyi; Bedő Csongor (2002). Hajdúdorog, Görög Katolikus Székesegyház ikonosztázion restaurálási dokumentációja. Budapest.

Secondary sources

- Dercsényi, Balázs (1991). Katolikus templomok Magyarországon. Budapest: Hegyi & Társa Kiadó. ISBN 963-7592-00-8.
- Katalin, Sz. Kürti (1952). "Szüts János hajdúkerületi és Kis András kismarjai piktorokról" (PDF). In Gazdag István (ed.). Hajdú-Bihar megyei Levéltár Évkönyve. Debrecen: Hajdú-Bihar megyei Levéltár. pp. 171–182. Archived from the original (PDF) on 2013-12-19.
- Károlyi Györgyi (2001). Hajdúdorog, Görög Katolikus Székesegyház belső restaurálása. Budapest.
- Radovics, Krisztina (1991). Faszobrászati restaurátori szakvélemény a hajdúdorogi görög katolikus templom ikonosztáz állapotáról. Budapest.
- Bodorné Szent-Gály, Erzsébet (1991). Hajdúdorog, Görög Katolikus Székesegyház ikonosztázionja, Restaurátori műleírás és költségvetés. Budapest.
- Nagy, Márta (1994). Ortodox ikonosztázionok Magyarországon. Debrecen. ISBN 963-450-872-3.
- Julian W. S. Litten (2004-04-07). "Symbolism on monuments". The Church Monuments Society.
- Nanon Gardin; Robert Olorenshow; Jean Gardin; Olivier Klein (2006). Szimbólumok Lexikona. Paris: Larousse. ISBN 2-03-505571-7.
- Pál József; Újvári Edit (1997). Szimbólumtár, jelképek, motívumok. Budapest. ISBN 963-506-168-4.
- Hans Biedermann (1996). Szimbólumlexikon. Budapest: Corvina Kiadó. ISBN 963-13-42336.
- Sashalmi Zoltán. "A fekete holló szimbolikája". Archived from the original on 2010-06-01.
- Bishop di Marzio (2005-08-13). "Mary, Our Model of Living". Diocese of Brooklyn. Archived from the original on 2011-07-01.
- Ross, Leslie (1996). Medieval art: a topical dictionary. Greenwood. ISBN 0-313-29329-5.
- Day, Peter (1993). The Liturgical Dictionary of Eastern Christianity. Burnes & Oates. ISBN 0-86012-216-6.
- Leonid Ouspensky; Vladimir Lossky (1999). The Meaning of Icons. St Vladimir's Seminary Press. ISBN 0-913836-77-X.
- Clarke, Adam (1817). Dr. Adam Clarke's Commentary on the New Testament. London: J. Butterworth & Son.
