= Neopaganism in Hungary =

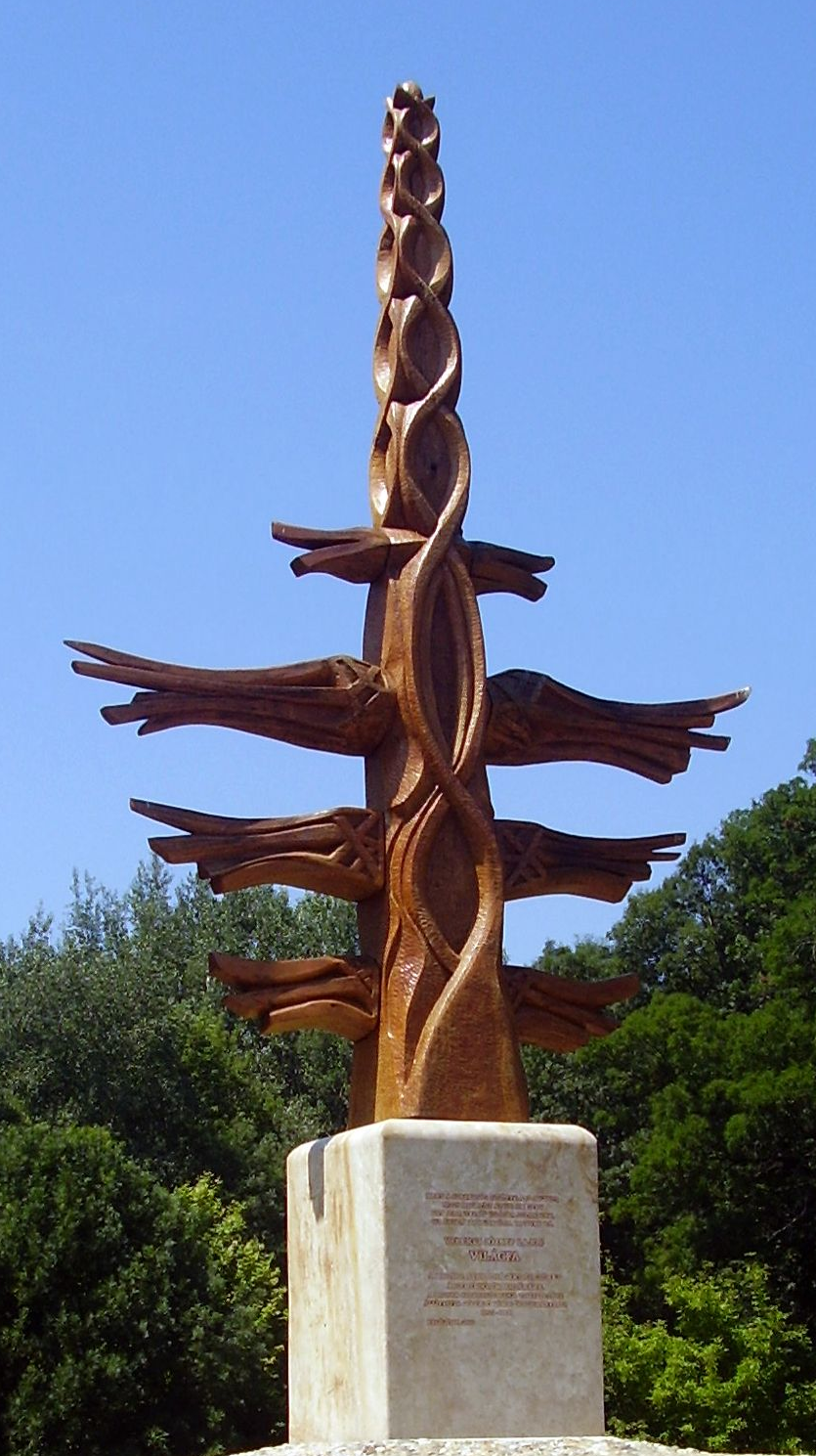
A világfa (world tree) erected in Gödöllő, Pest, Budapest metropolis.

Neopaganism in Hungary (Hungarian: Újpogányság) is very diverse, with followers of the Hungarian Native Faith and of other religions, including Wiccans, Kemetics, Mithraics, Druids and Christopagans.

Szilárdi (2006) describes the movement as a postmodern combination of ethnocentric linguistic, national, religious and occasional political patterns of identity. Interest in the reconstruction of an ethnic religion for the Hungarians manifested for the first time in the early 20th century. A contribution to the popularisation of Pagan ideas in the Hungarian society was the tremendous success of the rock opera István, a király in 1983.

== Religions ==
=== Christopaganism ===
Many Pagan groups in Hungary make use of Christian terminology and iconography re-interpreted in an ethnic Pagan way. This is the case of the "Church of Esoteric Beliefs — Church of the Holy Crown" (Hungarian: Ezoterikus Tanok Egyháza — Szent Korona Egyház), conceptualising a Scythian ancient religion with Christian character, worshiping the Fény Jézus ("Light Jesus") and the Boldogasszony ("Blessed Lady"), with the táltos as priests. The church has been establishing naptemplomok (singular: naptemplom), "temples of the Sun", as its places of worship. Another organisation of this kind is the "Our Lady's Love Church" (Nagyboldogasszony Szeretet Egyház).

=== Hungarian Neopaganism ===
Hungarian Neopaganism, the Hungarian native faith, or Ősmagyar Vallás (meaning "Ancient Hungarian Religion" or more accurately "Arch-Hungarian Religion") as it is called in the local Neopagan discourse, defines the movements which seek to rebuild a purely Hungarian ethnic religion, inspired to Hungarian mythology and folklore. This drift has roots in the ethnological studies of the early 20th century, while the elaboration of a national Hungarian religion was endorsed in the interwar Turanist circles (1930s-40s), finally blossoming alongside other Pagan religions since the fall of the Soviet Union. The difference between Hungarian Neopagan groups is often determined by their differing ideas about the historical origins of the Hungarians.

The development of the Hungarian Neopagan movements largely rely on the work of individual shamans or neoshamans, the táltos, who may organise themselves in associations, set up schools, or establish larger religious organisations. The shamans' movement started to come to light in the 1980s, organising cooperation with representatives of core shamanism from the United States since 1986. Those táltos who espouse a Turanist ideology often choose to affiliate with Tengrism.

The most important organisations of this kind are the Yotengrit, and the Ősmagyar Táltos Egyház ("Arch-Hungarian Táltos Church") founded by András Kovács-Magyar, who later also founded the Táltos Iskola ("Táltos School"). Other groups of this stream are the Ősmagyar Egyház ("Arch-Hungarian Church") and the Magyar Vallás Közössége ("Community of Hungarian Religion").

Another church of the Hungarian native faith is the Árpád Rendjének Jogalapja Tradicionális Egyház ("Traditional Church of the Order of Árpád"), founded in 2009. It is inspired by the Traditionalist School, the Nouvelle Droite of Alain de Benoist, and to the concept of a common Indo-European paganism.

=== Kemetism ===
The "Ankh — Church of Eternal Life" (Hungarian: Ankh — Az Örök Élet Egyháza) is a Kemetic church in Hungary, founded in 1999. They propose a theory that sees God as the source of the universe, himself being the universe, inclosing every conscious and unconscious being. The aim of the organisation is to cultivate and meet the gods, who are the powers acting in the creation.

=== Neo-Mithraism ===
The Sodalitas Mithraica (Latin for "Mithraic Fellowship") is a Neo-Mithraic group active in Hungary.

=== Wicca and Witchcraft ===
Magyar Boszorkányszövetség (meaning "Hungarian Witchcraft") is a Budapest-based Neopagan organization formed in 1986. Wicca, a religion of English origin, has spread to Hungary as in the other countries of Western Europe. Zsuzsanna Budapest, a Hungarian who emigrated to the United States, is the founder of the Wiccan denomination known as Dianic Wicca, popular in North America. The Celtic Wiccan Tradition Church (Kelta-Wicca Hagyományőrzők Egyháza) is a Celtic Wiccan church in Hungary. The Berkano Tradition, founded in 2005, is a current with mostly traditional Wiccan roots.

== See also ==
- Tengrism
- Shamanistic remnants in Hungarian folklore
- Hungarian mythology
- Hungarian Neopaganism
- Táltos
- Old Hungarian script
- Slavic Neopaganism
- Zsuzsanna Budapest

== Resources ==
- Ádám Kolozsi, Social Constructions of the Native Faith: Mytho-historical Narratives and Identity-discourse in Hungarian Neo-paganism, Central European University – Nationalism Studies Program, 2012.
- Réka Szilárdi, Awakening of Gods: Neopaganism in Hungary, ’Civil Religion, Private Spirituality’ Conference, 25–27 October 2007, Szeged, Re-Dial Association for the Study of Religions & the Department for the Study of Religions (University of Szeged).
- Shelley Rabinovitch, James Lewis, The Encyclopedia of Modern Witchcraft and Neo-Paganism, Kensington Publishing Corporation (2004), ISBN 978-0-8065-2407-8.
