= János Kriesch =

Hungarian zoologist

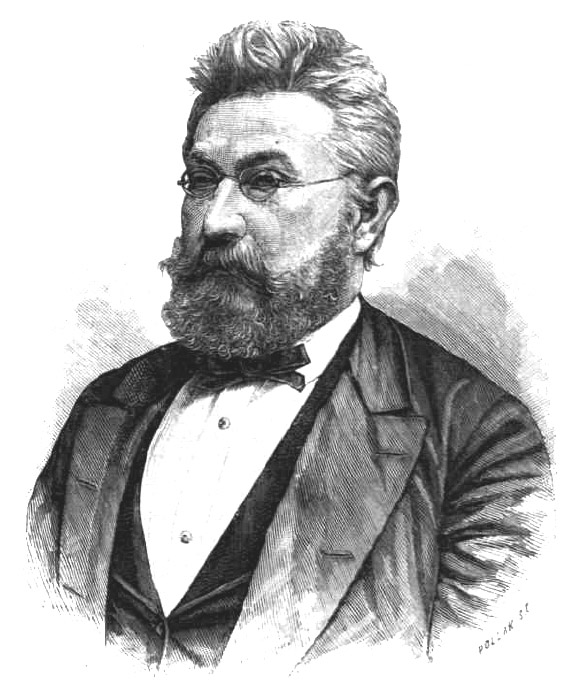
- Born: 29 March 1834; Reinthal, Austrian Empire (now Bernhardsthal, Austria)
- Died: 21 November 1888 (aged 54); Budapest, Austria-Hungary (now Budapest, Hungary)
- Education: Budapest University of Technology and Economics
- Occupations: zoologist, agronomist

János Kriesch (29 March 1834 – 21 October 1888) was a Hungarian hydrobiologist, zoologist, agronomist, and corresponding member of the Hungarian Academy of Sciences. He served as Director-General of Budapest Zoo & Botanical Garden for a short time in 1868.

His zoological work has primarily focused on the inspection of fishes and furthermore was among the first Hungarian representatives of Social Darwinism. One of his pupils was Lajos Méhelÿ. His son was Aladár Körösfői-Kriesch, a famous painter and artist.
