= Church of Eternal Life =

Church of Eternal Life may refer to:

- Ankh Church of Eternal Life, a Kemetic denomination founded in Hungary in 1999
- Church of Eternal Life, a fictional organization in the Anita Blake: Vampire Hunter series by Laurell K. Hamilton
- Church of Eternal Life, a South Korean organization founded by Choi Tae-min
- Church of Eternal Life, any of a number of congregations of the National Spiritualist Association of Churches
