= Helene Migerka =

Austrian poet and novelist

Helene Migerka (13 September 1867, Brno – 26 March 1928, Graz) was an Austrian poet and novelist. She was a daughter of the Austrian feminist and writer Katharina Kämpffat (1844, Tilsit – 1922) and museologist Franz Migerka (1828–1915).

Her cousin was Otto Neurath.

She committed suicide in 1928.

== Literary works ==
- Gedichte, 1889
- Neue Gedichte, 1895
- Das Glück der Häßlichen und andere Skizzen und Satiren, 1913
- Der neue Besen, 1920
