= Égig érő fa =

Element of Hungarian Shamanism

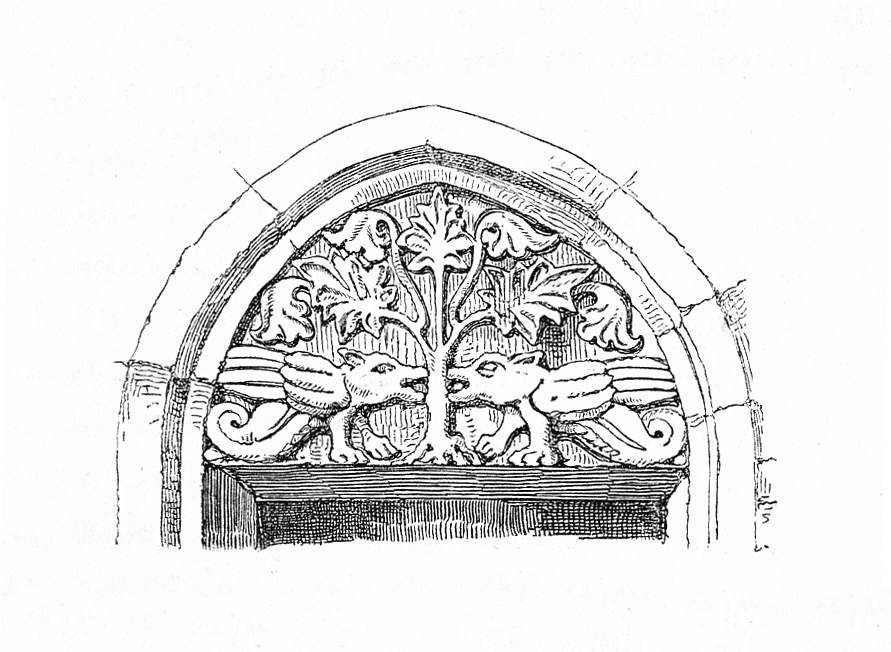
Égig érő fa

The égig érő fa ("sky-high tree"), also called életfa ("tree of life"), világfa ("world tree"), or tetejetlen fa ("tree without a top"), is an element of Hungarian shamanism and native faith, and a typical element of Hungarian folk art and folk tales, and also a distinct folk tale type.

Several of these tales have versions in the Transylvanian, Germanic, Romanian, Romani, Serbian, Croatian, Bulgarian, Turkish and other cultures in Asia, but the origin of the Hungarian tales goes back to the táltos traditions of Hungarians. The táltosok (shamans) are the humans who are entitled to climb up the égig érő fa and wander in the seven or nine layers of the sky.

One version of these tale is about the kiskondás (small swineherd) who climbs up the tree to save the princess who is held captive by a dragon (as told in the Világhírű Szép Miklós tale). The tree is a frequent element of certain funny tales, in which for example a gypsy climbs up into heaven and then down into hell.

The world tree often grows out of a reindeer or a horse. It often carries among its branches the Sun and the Moon. This latter concept is typical of Uralic and Siberian peoples. The tree often stands on the world mountain, with its top in the sky and its roots in hell, where snakes and toads live. In the tales birds often sit on the tree, for example eagles, hawks or the mythical Hungarian bird, the turul.

== Scholarly analysis ==
Hungarian scholarship argues that the Aarne-Thompson-Uther Index tale type AaTh 468, a tale type that involves climbing a giant tree, is a reflexion of ancient shamanistic practices. In particular, Hungarian-American scholar Linda Dégh, based on an analysis of ca. 70 variants of Hungary and nearby countries, concluded that the type AaTh 468, "The Tree That Reached to the Sky" is a "Hungarian ethnic tale", associated with "the prehistoric shamanistic religion of ancient Hungarians and their linguistic kindred".

Slavicist Karel Horálek, studying variants of the Aarne-Thompson-Uther Index tale type ATU 302, "Ogre's Heart in the Egg", remarked that a particular Central European (in Hungary and neighbouring countries) version of this type shows the hero climbing a giant tree and arriving at a hidden upper realm. After a series of adventures, he marries a princess of this upper realm and she gives him a set of keys, warning him never to open a certain door. He disobeys her and releases the villain of the tale - an episode very similar to the Russian tale Marya Morevna. Hungarian ethnographer Gyula Ortutay was of the opinion that this narrative was "a valuable Hungarian tale". On the other hand, Karel Horálek suggested that this narrative developed as a Hungarian oikotype, with its prominent feature the tall tree and the actions that surround it.

=== Tale combinations ===
According to scholar Christine Goldberg, further studies of tale type AaTh 468 using the historic-geographic method concluded that "its characteristic motif" is a shaman's tree; the tale type is "not widely known outside Hungary"; it shares episodes with other tale types, namely AT 300-310. (Note: For clarification: Type 300, "The Dragon-Slayer"; Type 300A, "Fight on the Bridge"; Type 301, "The Three Stolen Princesses; Type 302, "Ogre's (Devil's) Heart in the Egg"; Type 303, "Twins or Blood-Brothers"; Type 303A, "Brothers Seek Sisters as Wives"; Type 304, "The Dangerous Night-Watch"; Type 305, "Dragon's Heart-Blood as Remedy"; Type 306, "The Danced-Out Shoes"; Type 307, "The Princess in the Shroud"; Type 310, "The Maiden in the Tower".)

In the same vein, Linda Dégh, in her tabulation of all known variants available to her, indicated that type 468 included, in its narrative sequence, episodes of "a small circle" of other tale types: The Dragon Slayer (types 300-302), the I Don't Know complex (types 314, 530, 532), The Bride of the Other World (type 400), The Magic Flight (type 313). According to her, combination with type 301 appears in South Slavic variants, and with type 400 in Romania.

== Adaptations ==
The tree features in an episode of the Hungarian television series Magyar népmesék ("Hungarian Folk Tales") (hu), with the title Az égig érő fa ("The Giant Tree").

== See also ==
- Yggdrasil
- Hungarian Folktales (TV series) -"Magyar Népmesék II" (1979#2, "Az égig érő fa")
