= Lake Bernhardsthal =

Pond in Lower Austria

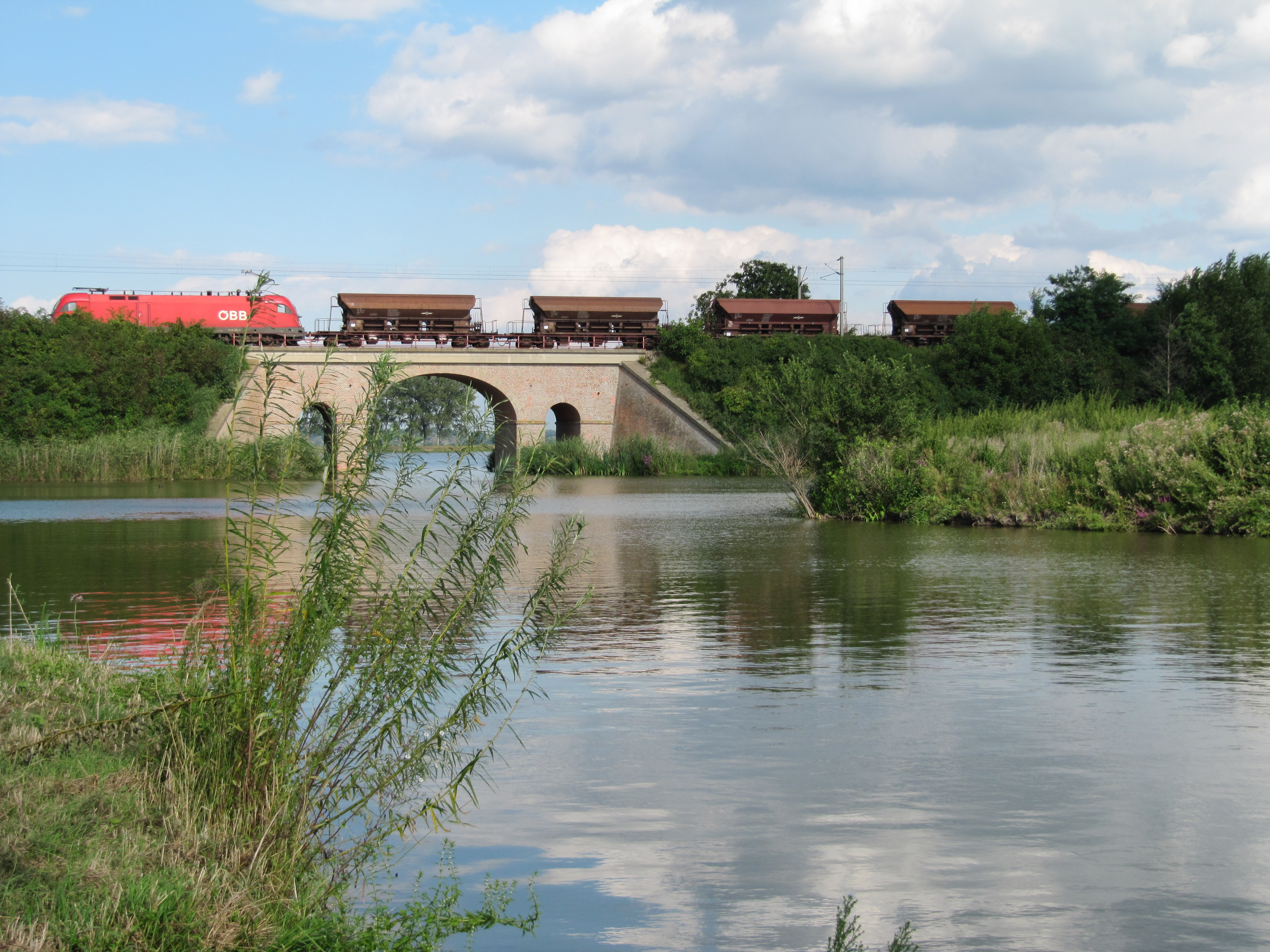
- Lake Bernhardsthal with the Nordbahn viaduct

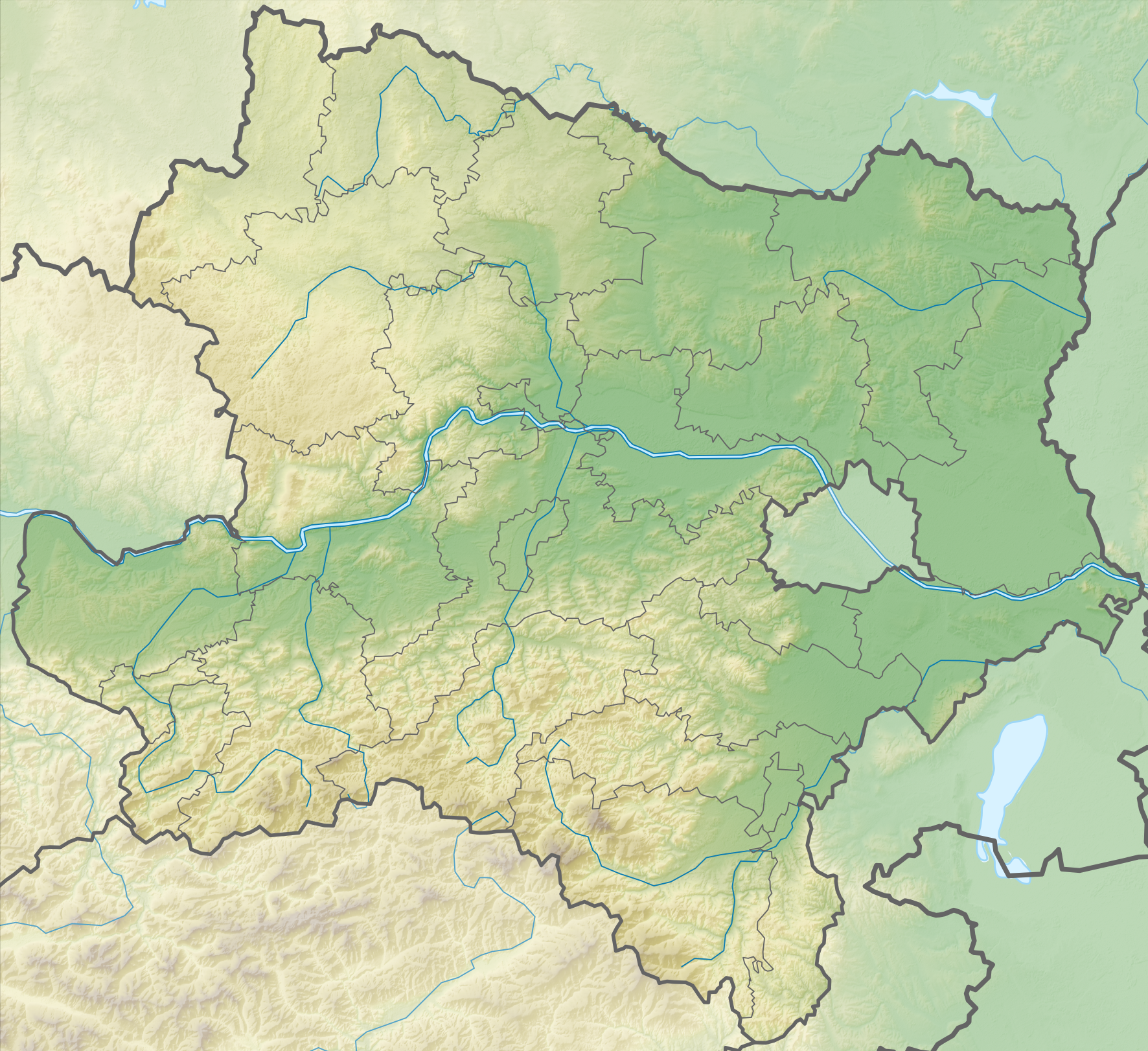
- Location within Lower Austria
- Location: Bernhardsthal, Lower Austria
- Coordinates: 48°41′35″N 16°52′48″E
- Type: Pond
- Basin countries: Austria
- Surface area: 25 ha (62 acres)
- Shore length^{1}: 2.7 km (1.7 mi)
- Settlements: Bernhardsthal
- ^{1} Shore length is not a well-defined measure.

Lake Bernhardsthal (German: Bernhardsthaler Teich or Landschaftsteich Bernhardsthal) is a pond in Bernhardsthal, the north-easternmost municipality of Lower Austria, near the border with the Czech Republic. With about 25 hectares of water and a shoreline of about 2.7 km, it is the largest body of water in the Weinviertel.

== History ==
In the 14th century, there were 14 ponds in the area. Lake Bernhardsthal is one of three that remain. Over the centuries, it was drained many times, mostly for fish health, and the bed was farmed for a few years at a time. Starting in 1980, the municipality bought the roughly 50-hectare site in stages from the Prince of Liechtenstein and restored the pond. This required removing about 80,000 cubic metres of soil from the silted-up bed.

== Railway viaduct ==
The embankment of the Nordbahn divides the pond in two. The brick railway bridge over it dates from 1839 and was designed in the office of Carl Ritter von Ghega. It is the oldest surviving railway bridge in Austria.

== Recreation ==
The pond is used for boating in summer and for ice skating and ice stock sport in winter. Fishing requires an annual permit. Swimming is currently prohibited.
