= Hungarian Turanism =

Ideology emphasising Hungarian unity with Inner Asian peoples

Hungarian Turanism (Hungarian: Turánizmus / Turanizmus) is a diverse Turanist phenomenon that revolves around an identification or association of Hungarians and Hungarian history with the histories and peoples of Inner Asia and the Eurasian Steppe. It includes many different conceptions and served as the guiding principle of many political movements. It was most lively in the second half of the 19th century and the first half of the 20th century.

== Overview ==
As a scientific movement, Turanism was concerned with research into Asian cultures in the context of Hungarian history and culture. It was embodied and represented by many scholars who had shared premises (i.e. the Asian origin of the Hungarians, and their kinship with Asian peoples), and arrived at the same or very similar conclusions. Turanism was a driving force in the development of the Hungarian social sciences, especially in the development of linguistics and archaeology.

Political Turanism was born in the 19th century, in response to the growing influence of Pan-Germanism and Pan-Slavism, both of which were seen by Hungarians as very dangerous to the nation, and the state of Hungary, because the country had large ethnic German and Slavic populations. The foundations of political Turanism were influenced by the works of 19th-century linguists and ethnologists, such as Finnish nationalist and scholar Matthias Alexander Castrén, who presented a belief in the racial unity the Ural-Altaic peoples. Political Turanism was a romantic nationalist movement, which stressed the importance of the common ancestry and the cultural affinity of the Hungarians, the peoples of the Caucasus and the peoples of Inner and Central Asia, such as the Turks, Mongols, Parsis etc. It called for closer collaboration and a political alliance between them and Hungary, as a means of securing and furthering the shared interests and countering the threats which were posed by the policies of the great powers of Europe. The idea of a "Turanian brotherhood and collaboration" was borrowed from the Pan-Slavic concept of "Slavic brotherhood and collaboration".

After the First World War, political Turanism played a role in the formation of Hungarian far-right ideologies because of its ethnic nationalist nature. It began to carry anti-Jewish sentiments and tried to prove the "existence and superiority of a unified Hungarian race". Nonetheless, Andrew C. Janos, a Hungarian political scientist of the University of California, Berkeley, asserts that Turanism's role in the interwar development of far-right ideologies was negligible.

In the communist era which began after the Second World War and ended in 1989, Turanism was portrayed and vilified as an exclusively fascist ideology. Since the fall of communism in 1989 there has been a renewal of interest in Turanism.

== Background ==
=== Early history of the Hungarians ===
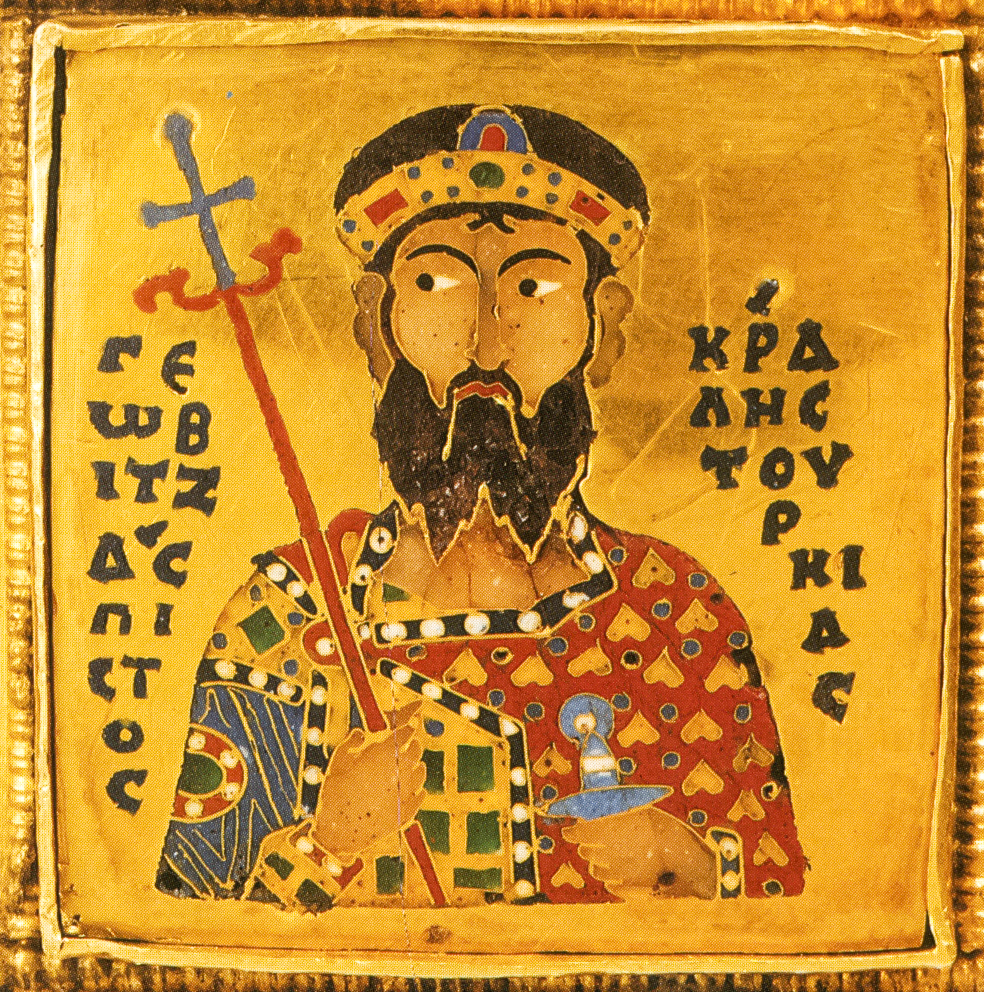
"Géza, the faithful king of Tourkia (i.e. Hungary)" on the Holy Crown of Hungary, from the 11th century.

Before the Hungarian conquest of the Carpathian Basin, the Hungarians were semi-nomadic and their culture was similar to other steppe peoples. Most scientists presume a Uralic homeland for the ancient Hungarian conquerors (mainly on genealogical linguistic grounds, and on the basis of genetic research carried out on a limited number of ancient skeletons found in graves from the age of the conquest). The proto-Hungarian tribes lived in the Eurasian forest steppe zone, and so these ancient ancestors of Hungarians and their relationship with other equestrian nomadic peoples has been and still is a topic for research.

Hungarian nobiliary historical tradition considered and rendered the eastern origin of Hungarians. This tradition was preserved in medieval chronicles (such as Gesta Hungarorum and Gesta Hunnorum et Hungarorum, the Chronicon Pictum, and Chronica Hungarorum by Johannes de Thurocz) as early as the 13th century. According to Chronica Hungarorum, the Hungarians are descendants of the Huns, and came from the Asian parts of Scythia, and Turks share this Scythian origin with them. This tradition eventually served as starting point for the scientific research of the ethnogenesis of Hungarian people, which began in the 18th century, in Hungary and abroad. Sándor Kőrösi Csoma (the writer of the first Tibetan-English dictionary) traveled to Asia in the strong belief that he could find the kindred of Magyars in somewhere in Central Asia, amongst the Uyghurs.

=== Development of Finno-Ugric studies ===
It is a well-known fact that the marked interest in the genetic classification of languages prevailing in the last century and at the beginning of the present one has its roots in European nationalisms. The exact knowledge of dialects and languages was supposed to strengthen the national individuality and to align nations in 'natural' alliances.

The linguistic theories of the Dutch philosopher Marcus Zuerius van Boxhorn and the German thinker Gottfried Wilhelm Leibniz gave the basis of the modern scientific research of the origin of the Hungarian language and people. Boxhorn conjectured that the European and Indo-Iranian languages were all derived from a shared ancestor language, and he named this ancestor language "Scythian", after the equestrian, nomadic warriors of the Asian steppes. But linguists theorizing about ancestor languages had to deal with the common belief of the era, that, according to the Bible, Hebrew was the original language of all humans. Leibniz published material countering the Biblical theory, and supported Boxhorn's notion of a Scythian ancestor language behind most of the languages of Europe (today known as the Indo-European language family). Leibniz however also recognized that some European languages like Sami, Finnish, and Hungarian were connected to each other, but did not belong to this family.

"Information about hither-to unknown peoples and languages of Asia and the Americas came into the hands of scholars such as Gottfried Leibniz, who recognized that there was no better method “for specifying the relationship and origin of the various peoples of the earth, than the comparison of their languages”. In order to classify as many languages as possible in genealogical groupings, Leibniz proposed that similar materials be collected from each newly described language. To this end he asked that explorers either obtain translations of well-known Christian prayers such as the Pater Noster, or, better yet, “words for common things” (vocabula rerum vulgarium), a sample list of which he appended to a letter to the Turkologist D. Podesta (Leibniz 1768/1989b). The word list included numerals, kinship terms, body parts, necessitates (food, drink, weapons, domestic animals), naturalia (God, celestial and weather phenomena, topographic features, wild animals) and a dozen verbs (eat, drink, speak, see ...). Leibniz took a particular interest in the expansion of the Russian Empire southward and eastward, and lists based on his model were taken on expeditions sent by the tsars to study the territories recently brought under their control, as well as the peoples living on these and on nearby lands." Kevin Tuite: The rise and fall and revival of the Ibero-Caucasian hypothesis. 2008. in: Historiographia Linguistica, 35 #1; p. 23-82.

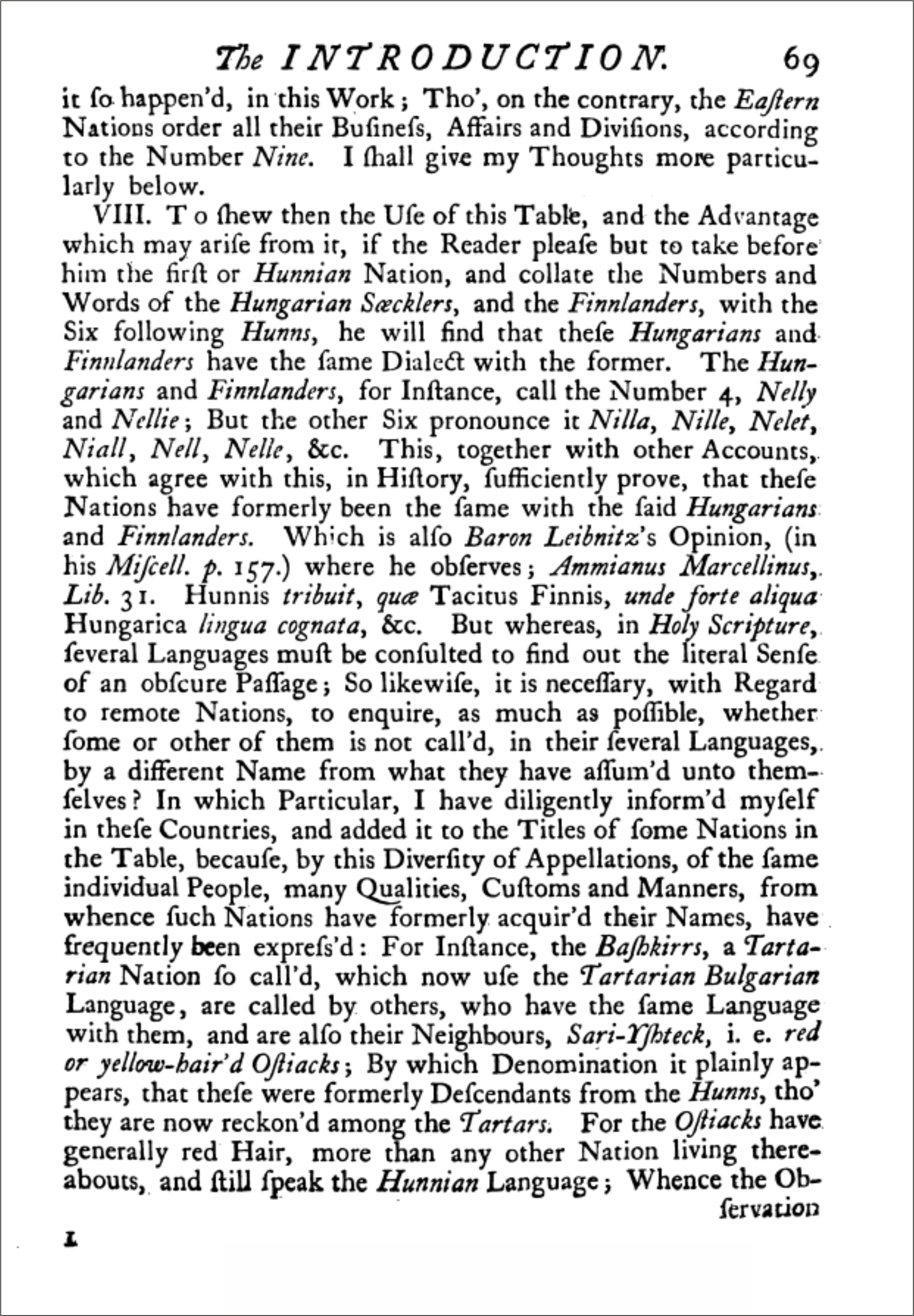
Philipp Johann von Strahlenberg about the kinship of Finnish and Hungarian language, in his book "An historico-geographical description of the north and east parts of Europe and Asia" 1738. London.

The Finnish-Hungarian connection was further developed by Philip Johan von Strahlenberg (in his work: "An historico-geographical description of the north and east parts of Europe and Asia") and Johann Eberhard Fischer, a German historian and language researcher, who participated in the Great Northern Expedition of 1733–1743. In his work “Qvaestiones Petropolitanae, De origine Ungrorum”, published in 1770, Fischer put Hungarian into a group of kindred peoples and languages which he called 'Scythian' (distinct from van Boxhorn's concept of Scythian). He considered the Ugric peoples (he called them 'Jugors', these are the Khanty and Mansi) the closest relatives of Hungarians, actually as 'Magyars left behind', and originated them from the Uyghurs, who live on the western frontiers of China.

=== Ural-Altaic and the Turanian concept ===
By the early 19th century, connections with further languages were perceived by Rasmus Christian Rask, Wilhelm Schott and Matthias Castrén, who included the Finno-Ugric languages as a part of a larger hypothesis today known as Ural-Altaic. The German linguist and Orientalist Schott was a proponent of Finn-Turk-Hungarian kinship, and considered the Hungarians a mixture of Turks and "Hyperboreans" (i.e. circumpolar peoples like the Saami and Samoyeds).

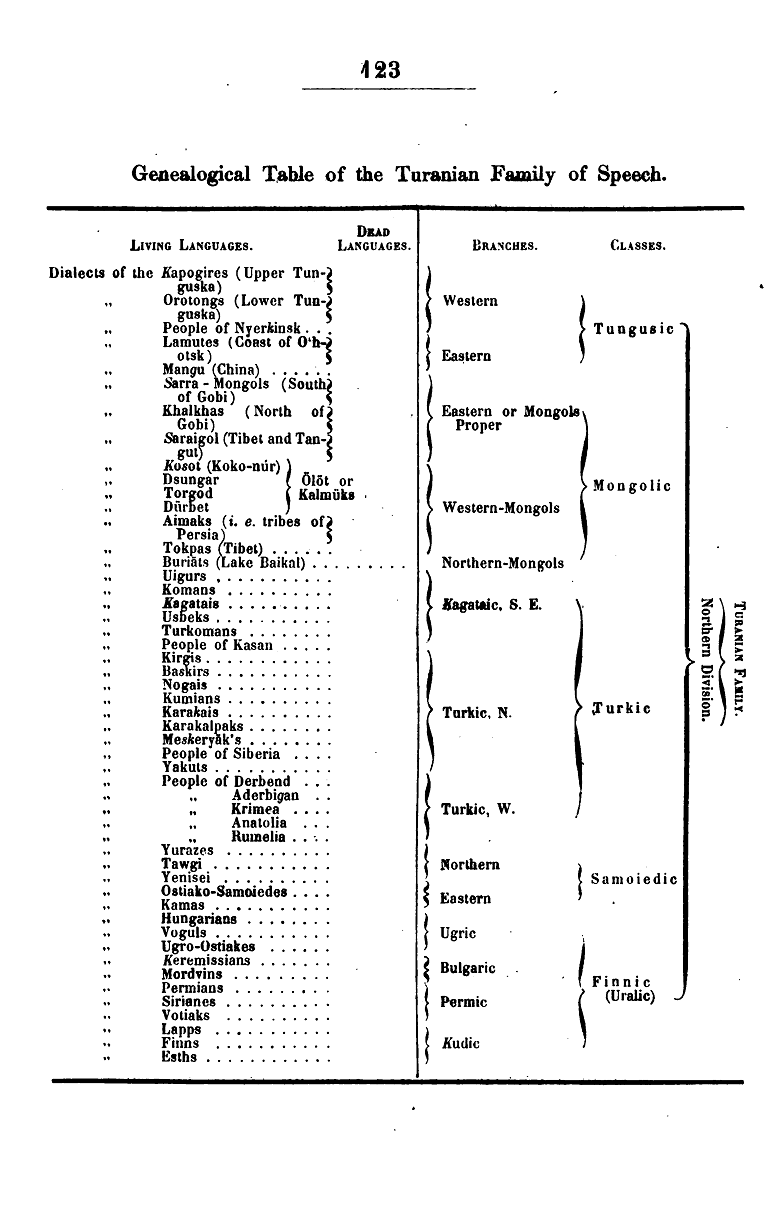
Friedrich Max Müller's Northern Division of Turanian Languages

Friedrich Max Müller, the German Orientalist and philologist, published and proposed a grouping of the non-Aryan and non-Semitic Asian languages in 1855. In his work "The languages of the seat of war in the East. With a survey of the three families of language, Semitic, Arian, and Turanian", he called these languages "Turanian". The Hungarian language was classed by Müller as a member of a Northern Division (Ural-Altaic), in the Finnic Class (Finno-Ugric), in the Ugric Branch, with the Voguls (Mansi) and Ugro-Ostiakes (Khanty) as its closest relatives. (In the long run, his evolutionist theory about languages' structural development, tying growing grammatical refinement to socio-economic development, and grouping languages into 'antediluvian', 'familial', 'nomadic', and 'political' developmental stages proved unsound.) His theory was well known and widely discussed in international scientific circles, and was known to Hungarian scientists as well. He became an associate member of the Hungarian Academy of Sciences. His public lectures received wide attention. His terms "Turan" and "Turanian" were originally borrowed from Persian texts like the Shahnameh, which used the term "Turan" to denote the territories of Turkestan, north of Amu Darya river, inhabited by nomadic warriors.

=== The role of the Habsburgs ===
In Hungary, discourse on the prehistory of the Hungarians generally lacked the political meanings up until the Hungarian Revolution of 1848 and the 1848-49 War of Independence, but after the bitter experiences of the war and the defeat, many phenomena received new political overtones.

"… the Sun went down into a sea of blood. The night of immeasurable grief fell on Hungary; her noblest powers were broken. Even the gates of scientific institutions became closed…"

"…a Nap vértengerbe áldozott le. Magyarországra a mérhetetlen gyásznak éjszakája borult; legnemesebb erői törve voltak. Még a tudományos intézetek kapui is bezárultak…"

(Herman Ottó: Petényi J. S. a magyar tudományos madártan megalapítója. p. 39.)

Hungary's constitution and her territorial integrity were abolished, and her territory was partitioned into crown lands. This signalled the start of a long era of absolutist rule. The Habsburgs introduced dictatorial rule, and every aspect of Hungarian life was put under close scrutiny and governmental control. Press and theatrical/public performances were censored.

German became the official language of public administration. The edict issued on 1849.X.9. (Grundsätze für die provisorische Organisation des Unterrichtswesens in dem Kronlande Ungarn), placed education under state control, the curriculum was prescribed and controlled by the state, the education of national history was confined, and history was educated from a Habsburg viewpoint. Even the bastion of Hungarian culture, the academy was kept under control: the institution was staffed with foreigners, mostly Germans and ethnic Germans, and the institution was practically defunct until the end of 1858. Hungarians responded with passive resistance. Questions of nation, language, national origin became politically sensitive matters. Anti-Habsburg and anti-German sentiments were strong. A large number of freedom fighters took refuge in the Ottoman Empire. This resulted in renewed cultural exchange, and mutual sympathy. Turks were seen by many as good allies of the Hungarian cause. Such was the atmosphere, when Vámbéry traveled to Constantinople in 1857 for the first time.

"It should happen and it will happen - I encouraged myself with this, and did not hurt me other problems, just this one: how could I get a passport from the strict and suspicious Austrian authorities, and exactly to Turkey, where the Hungarian emigration resided, and, as was believed in Vienna, made rebellious plans tirelessly."

"Mennie kell és menni fog, - ezzel biztattam magam és nem bántott más gond, csak az az egy: hogy mi úton-módon kaphatok útlevelet a szigorú és gyanakvó osztrák hatóságtól; hozzá még épen Törökországba, hol akkor a magyar emigráczió tartotta székét és, mint Bécsben hitték, pártütő terveket sző fáradhatatlanúl.

(Vámbéry Ármin: Küzdelmeim. Ch. IV. p. 42.)

And this atmosphere granted public interest for the then new theory of Max Müller. The Habsburg government saw this "Turkism" as dangerous to the empire, but had no means to suppress it. (The Habsburg Empire lost Flanders and Luxembourg in the early 19th century, and lost most of its Italian holdings a little later, so many members of the Austrian political elite (Franz Joseph I of Austria himself, Archduke Albrecht, Duke of Teschen, major general Ferdinand Franz Xaver Johann Freiherr Mayerhofer von Grünbühel for example)) dreamed about Eastern land grabs.)

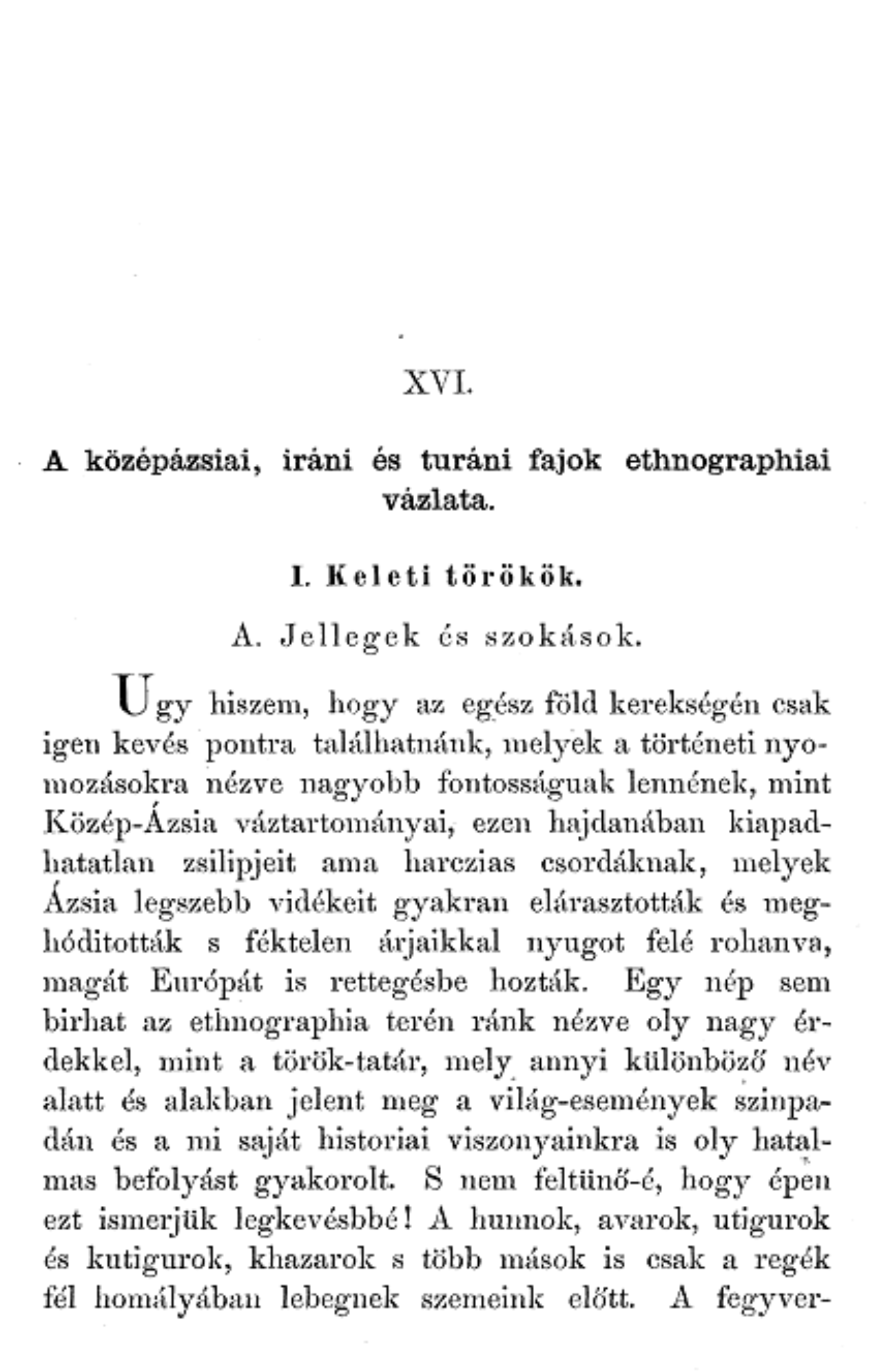
Vámbéry Ármin about Turanian peoples in his "Vámbéry Ármin vázlatai Közép-Ázsiából. Ujabb adalékok az oxusmelléki országok népismereti, társadalmi és politikai viszonyaihoz." 1868. Pest

As a consequence of the Franco-Austrian War and the Austro-Prussian War, the Habsburg Empire was on the verge of collapse in 1866, because these misfortunate military endeavours resulted in increased state spending, speeding inflation, towering state debts and financial crisis.

The Habsburgs were forced to reconcile with Hungary, to save their empire and dynasty. The Habsburgs and part of the Hungarian political elite arranged the Austro-Hungarian Compromise of 1867. The Compromise was arranged and legitimated by a very small part of the Hungarian society (suffrage was very limited: less than 8 percent of the population had voting rights), and was seen by a very large part of the population as betrayal of the Hungarian cause and the heritage of the 1848-49 War of Independence. This caused deep and lasting cracks in Hungarian society. Academic science remained under state scrutiny and pressure, and press remained under (albeit more permissive) censorship. Matters of nation, language, national origin remained politically sensitive themes, and Turkism remained popular.

"However, to get the Compromise accepted within the society posed serious difficulties. Many counties (for example Heves, Pest, Szatmár) rejected the Compromise and stood up for Kossuth, the opposition organized a network of Democratic circles, on the Great Hungarian Plain anti-government and anti-Compromise demonstrations of several thousand men took place, etc.

"Viszont a kiegyezés elfogadtatása a társadalommal, komoly nehézségekbe ütközött. Több megye (például Heves, Pest, Szatmár) elutasította a kiegyezést és kiállt Kossuth mellett, az ellenzék megszervezte a demokrata körök hálózatát, az Alföldön többezres kormány- és kiegyezés-ellenes népgyűlésekre került sor stb.

(Cieger András: Kormány a mérlegen - a múlt században.)

==== Habsburg conspiracy theory ====
According to the Habsburg conspiracy theory, the Habsburgs promoted "Finno-Ugrianism" in order to deprive the nation of its historical past and thus break the national pride and resistance of the Hungarians. This speculation seems to be contradicted by the fact that compulsory education in Hungarian history was introduced in Hungary under Queen Maria Theresa with the first Ratio Educationis educational decree of 1777.

The modern legends about the alleged repression of Turanism by the Habsburgs or the Austro-Hungarian Monarchy are sharply contradicted by the fact that the members and supporters of the Turanian Society included Hungarian prime ministers, parliamentary party leaders, the country's leading industrial magnates, representatives of the Hungarian financial elite and representatives of the relevant newspapers. In 1916, the Turán Society became the Hungarian Oriental Cultural Centre and was housed in the upper house of the Hungarian Parliament, with its own press department and academic sections.

The Habsburg conspiracy theory only appeared in the mid-1970s. It is based on an alleged quotation attributed to Ágoston Trefort, which appeared in an article by György Hary in the Hungarian edition of the journal Valóság (Validity), issue 10, 1976, entitled "Kiegészítések egy nyelvvita történetéhez" (Additions to the history of a language dispute). However, the authenticity of this oft-quoted quotation has not yet been verified.

== Development of Turanism ==
=== Ármin Vámbéry's work ===
The Orientalist and Turkologist Ármin Vámbéry was a key figure in the development of Turanism. Since the late 1850s, proposed connections to the Finno-Ugric, Turkic and other Asiatic peoples and languages motivated him to travel to Asia and the Ottoman Empire.

"…from this came my hope, that with the help of comparative linguistics I could find a ray of light in Central Asia, which dispels the gloom over the dark corners of Hungarian prehistory..."
"...következett tehát ebből az a reménységem, hogy Középázsiában az összehasonlító nyelvtudomány segítségével világosságot vető sugarat lelhetek, mely eloszlatja a homályt a magyar őstörténelem sötét tájairól...." in: Vámbéry Ármin: Küzdelmeim. Ch.IV. p. 62.

Vámbéry started his second journey into Asia in July 1861 with the approval and monetary help of the Akadémia and its president, Emil Dessewffy. After a long and perilous journey he arrived at Pest in May 1864. He went to London to arrange the English language publication of his book about the travels. "Travels in Central Asia" and its Hungarian counterpart "Közép-ázsiai utazás" were published in 1865. Thanks to his travels Vámbéry became an internationally renowned writer and celebrity. He became acquainted with members of British upper class. The Ambassador of Austria in London gave him a letter of recommendation to the Emperor, who received him in an audience and rewarded Vámbéry's international success by granting him professorship in the Royal University of Pest.

In a work from 1868, Vámbéry may have been the first to use the word turáni ("Turanian") in a Hungarian language scientific text. Vámbéry used "Turan" (Turán) to denote the areas of Eastern Balkan, Central and Inner Asia inhabited by Turkic peoples, and "Turanian" to denote those Turkic peoples and languages (and he meant the Finno-Ugric peoples and languages as the members of this group), which lived in or originated from this "Turan" area. Hungarian scientists shared his definition. But in common parlance these terms were used in many (and often different) meanings and senses.

Vámbéry was a talented writer of popular science, who presented serious scientific matters in an interesting, readable manner. His books and other writings, presenting customs, traditions and culture of far-flung peoples and faraway places were key in raising wide public interest in ethnography, ethnology and history. Coupled with widespread disillusionment about the political elite, Vámbéry's work turned public attention to the lower classes and peasantry, as better heirs and keepers of real Hungarian legacy. (The neologists of the first half of the 19th century had already turned towards folklore, myths, ballads and tales in their search of a new national literary style, but had not had interest in other aspects of rural peasant life.)

Vámbéry was also the first to put forward a significant alternative origin theory of the Hungarian people and language. His'first large linguistic work, entitled "Magyar és török-tatár nyelvekbeli szóegyezések" and published in 1869–70, was the casus belli of the "Ugric-Turkic War" (Ugor-török háború), which started as a scientific dispute, but quickly turned into a bitter feud which spanned two decades. In this work, Vámbéry tried to demonstrate, with the help of word comparisons, that as a result of the intermingling of the early Hungarians with Turkic peoples, the Hungarian language gained a distinct dual character which was both Ugric AND Turkic, albeit it is basically Ugric in origin, so he presented a variant of the linguistic contact theory.

=== Later researchers ===
Vámbéry's "Ugric-Turkic War" was never closed properly. This forced scientists to try to harmonize and synthesize the differing theories somehow. This resulted in the development of a complex national mythology. This combined the Asian roots and origins of Magyars with their European present. Turanism got a new meaning: it became the given name of a variant of Orientalism, which researched Asia and its culture in context of Hungarian history and culture.

Turanism was a driving force in the development of Hungarian social sciences, especially linguistics, ethnography, history, archaeology, and Orientalism, and in the development of Hungarian arts, from architecture to applied and decorative arts. Turanist scientists greatly contributed to the development of Hungarian and international science and arts.

This is a short list of Turkist/Turanist scientists and artists, who have left a lasting legacy in Hungarian culture:

- Ármin Vámbéry (1832–1913) was the founding father of Hungarian Turkology. He founded Europe's first Turcology department at the Royal University of Pest (present day Eötvös Loránd University). He was a member of the MTA (Hungarian Academy of Sciences).
- János Arany (1817–1882), poet, writer of a large corpus of poems about Hungarian historical past. He supported Vámbéry in the "Ugric-Turkic War". He was a member and secretary general of the MTA.
- Ferenc Pulszky (1814–1897), archaeologist, art historian. He was a member of the MTA and the director of Magyar Nemzeti Múzeum (Hungarian National Museum). He supported Vámbéry in the "Ugric-Turkic War".
- Alajos Paikert (1866–1948) Was the founding father of the "Magyar Mezőgazdasági Múzeum" (Museum of Hungarian Agriculture), and one of the founders of the Turan Society.
- Béla Széchenyi (1837-1918), traveler and explorer of Asia. He was a member of the MTA.
- Jenő Zichy (1837–1906), traveler and explorer of Asia. He was a member of the MTA.
- Géza Nagy (1855-1915), archaeologist, ethnographer. He was a member of the MTA.
- Henrik Marczali (1856–1940), historian. He was a member of the MTA.
- Sándor Márki (1853–1925), historian. He was a member of the MTA.
- Lajos Lóczy (1849–1920), geologist, geographer. He was a member of the MTA.
- Jenő Cholnoky (1870–1950), geographer. He was a member of the MTA.
- Vilmos Pröhle (1871–1946), Orientalist, linguist, one of the first researchers of Chinese and Japanese language and literature in Hungary.
- Benedek Baráthosi Balogh (1870–1945), Orientalist, ethnographer, traveler.
- Gyula Sebestyén (1864–1946), folklorist, ethnographer. He was a member of the MTA.
- Ferenc Zajti (1886–1961), Orientalist, painter. He was the warden/curator of the Oriental Collection of the Fővárosi Könyvtár (“Library of the Capital” in English, the present day Fővárosi Szabó Ervin Könyvtár). He was the founder of the Magyar Indiai Társaság ( Hungarian India Society). He arranged Rabindranáth Tagore's visit to Hungary in 1926.
- József Huszka (1854–1934), art teacher, ethnographer.
- Aladár Körösfői-Kriesch (1863–1920), painter, sculptor, artisan, art theorist, one of the founders of the Gödöllő artists' colony, a leading figure of the Hungarian Arts & Crafts movement.
- Ödön Lechner (1845–1914), architect, who created a new national architectural style from the elements of Hungarian folk art, Persian, Sassanian and Indian art.
- Károly Kós (1883–1977), architect, writer, graphic artist, a leading figure of the Hungarian Arts & Crafts movement.

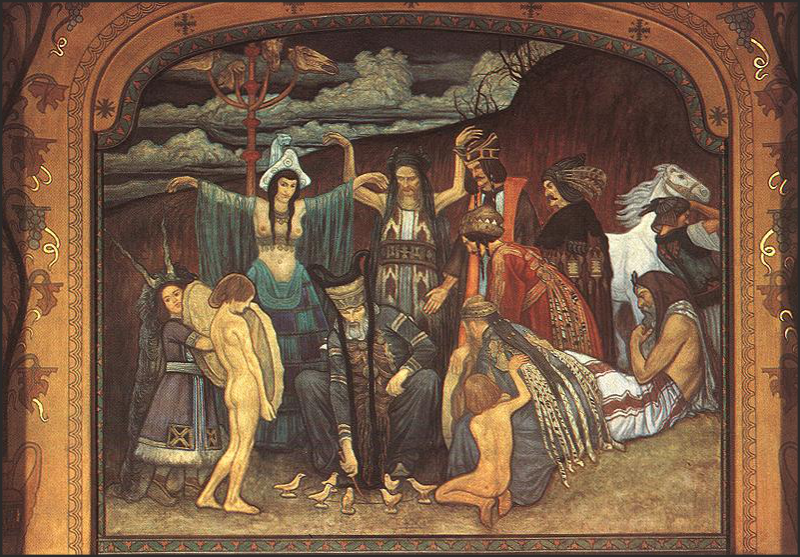
Aladár Körösfői-Kriesch: "Circle Dance of Shamans" 1911. Marosvásárhely, Kulturpalota

At the beginning of Hungarian Turanism, some of its notable promoters and researchers like Vámbéry, Vilmos Hevesy, (Note: Also known as Wilhelm von Hevesy (1877-1945). He was the older brother of György Hevesy, and an electrical engineer by profession, although he was kind of a Finno-Ugrist publishing books and other writings about the Finno-Ugric-Munda kinship, like "Munda-Magyar-Maori, an Indian link between the antipodes new tracks of Hungarian origins" and "Finnisch-Ugrisches aus Indien" in the 1920s and 30's.) and Ignác Goldziher were Jewish or of Jewish descent (Vámbéry was neither proud nor ashamed of his Jewish ancestry, he became a member of the Reformed Church, and considered himself Hungarian).

The idea of a Hungarian Oriental Institute originated from Jenő Zichy. Unfortunately, this idea did not come true. Instead, a kind of lyceum was formed in 1910, called "Turáni Társaság" (The Hungarian Turan Society (also called The Hungarian Asiatic Society)). The Turan society concentrated on Turan as a geographic location where the ancestors of Hungarians might have lived.

"The goal of Turanian Society is the cultural and economic progress, confederation, flourishment of all Turanians, i.e. the Hungarian nation and all kindred European and Asian nations, furthermore the geographical, ethnographical, economical etc. research of the Asian continent, past and present. Political and religious issues are excluded. It wishes to accomplish its objectives in agreement with non-Turanian nations."
"Turáni Társaság célja az egész turánság, vagyis a magyar nemzet és a velünk rokon többi európai és ázsiai népek kulturális és gazdasági előrehaladása, tömörülése, erősödése, úgymint az ázsiai kontinens földrajzi, néprajzi, gazdasági stb. kutatása múltban és jelenben. Politikai és felekezeti kérdések kizártak. Céljait a nem turáni népekkel egyetértve óhajtja elérni."

The scholars of the Turan society interpreted the ethnic and linguistic kinship and relations between Hungarians and the so-called Turanian peoples on the basis of the then prevailing Ural-Altaic linguistic theory. The Society arranged Turkish, Finnish and Japanese language courses. The Turan Society arranged and funded five expeditions into Asia till 1914: the Mészáros-Milleker expedition, the Timkó expedition, the Milleker expedition, the Kovács-Holzwarth expedition, and the Sebők-Schutz expedition.) The Society held public lectures regularly. Lecturers included `Abdu'l-Bahá and Shuho Chiba. After the outbreak of First World War politics ensnarled the work of the Society. In 1916, the Turan Society was redressed into the "Hungarian Eastern Cultural Centre" (Magyar Keleti Kultúrközpont), and direct governmental influence over its operation grew. The defeat in the First World War, and the following revolutionary movements and Entente occupation of the country disrupted the operation of the Eastern Cultural Centre, so real work began only in 1920. But the organisation was split into three that year, because of pronounced internal ideological stresses. Those who wanted a more sciencelike approach formed the "Kőrösi Csoma Society" (Kőrösi Csoma-Társaság). The more radical political Turanists left the Turan Society, and formed the "Turan Federation of Hungary" (Magyarországi Turán Szövetség).

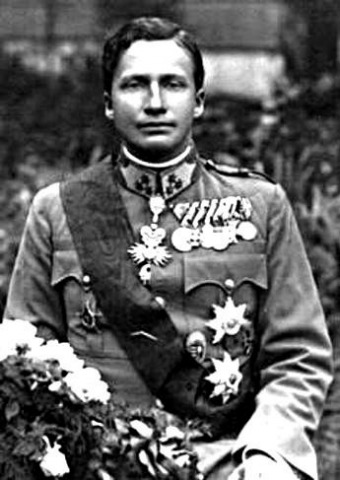
Archduke Joseph Francis Habsburg, the first patron of the Hungarian Turan Society

In 1920, Archduke Joseph Francis of Austria (Archduke Joseph Francis Habsburg) became the first patron of the Hungarian Turan Society.

== Political Turanism ==
Hungarians and their ancestors lived amongst or in direct contact with Turkic peoples from time immemorial to 1908. (A common Hungarian-Turkish border ceased to exist after 1908, in the wake of the annexation of Bosnia and Herzegovina and the evacuation of the Sanjak of Novi Pazar.) These peoples played an eminent role in the birth and formation of Hungarian people, language, culture, state and nation. During the ethnogenesis of Hungarian people, Kabar, Jász (Alan), Avar, Bulgar, Besenyő (Pecheneg), Kun (Cuman) tribes and population fragments merged and amalgamated into the Hungarian population.

Hungary warred with the Ottoman Empire for centuries. As a result of a discord of succession Hungary broke up into three parts in the 16th century: one was under Habsburg rule, one became part of the Ottoman Empire (1541.VIII.29.), and the third formed the “keleti Magyar Királyság” (Eastern Hungarian Kingdom)/ “Erdélyi Fejedelemség” (Principality of Transylvania). Erdély became an ally of the Ottomans (1528.II. 29.). The intensive everyday contacts in the one and a half centuries that followed resulted in pronounced Ottoman Turkish influence on Hungarian art and culture from music to jewellery and clothing, from agriculture to warfare. In the last third of the 17th century strife intensified between the Ottomans and the Habsburgs. The main scene of these power struggles was the territory of Hungary. The Ottoman attempts at further territorial expansion failed in the end and the Habsburgs reconquered the Hungarian territories. But there was a conflict in the circles of Hungarian political elite: many members of it were unwilling to swap the Ottoman alliance for direct Habsburg rule. A large group aspired for full independence, but felt Turkish dependence more amenable than Habsburg reign. Thököly's liberation movement and Rákóczi's War of Independence meant the climax of this Turkism. So, as one can see, Turkish orientation had a long tradition in Hungary.

Turkism was reborn in the wake of the 1848-49 War of Independence. During the war Hungary was attacked by the Habsburgs, and many of her ethnic minorities turned against the country. Serious clashes occurred in Transylvania and between the Hungarians and the Serbs of the South. There were serious mutual atrocities between ethnic Hungarians and Romanian ethnics in Transylvania; these events are remembered as the "Vlach rampages" (oláhjárások) and "Rascian rampages" (rácjárások). Hungary was defeated with the help of Russian military intervention.

These painful events and experiences changed Hungarians' attitudes profoundly: They began to feel themselves insecure and endangered in their own home. From this time on, Pan-Slavism and Pan-Germanism were seen as serious threats to the existence of Hungary and Hungarians. Hungarians looked for allies and friends to secure their position. They turned towards the rivals of the Habsburgs - to Turkey, to the Italians, even to the Prussians - for support and help. Hungarians were interested in a stable, strong and friendly Turkey, capable of preventing Russian and/or Habsburg expansion in the Balkans.

Hungarian political movements and attempts to regain independence proved unfruitful. At the same time, the Habsburgs were unable to acquire the leading position of the German union, and Germany became united under Prussian rule. The Habsburgs took their empire to the verge of collapse with a series of miscalculated political and military moves. This led to the Austro-Hungarian Compromise of 1867. The Hungarian supporters of the Compromise have argued that the already weakened Austria is no longer a threat to the Hungarians, but can help prevent Slavic expansion.

Despite the Compromise, the Hungarians were ambivalent towards these old-new Austrian allies.

"If the balance of opinion in Hungary were always determined by sober political calculation, this brave and independent people, isolated in the broad ocean of Slav populations, and comparatively insignificant in numbers, would remain constant to the conviction that its position can only be secured by the support of the German element in Austria and Germany. But the Kossuth episode, and the suppression in Hungary itself of the German elements that remained loyal to the Empire, with other symptoms showed that among Hungarian hussars and lawyers self confidence is apt in critical moments to get the better of political calculation and self-control. Even in quiet times many a Magyar will get the gypsies to play to him the song, 'Der Deutsche ist ein Hundsfott' ('The German is a blackguard')." Bismarck, Otto von: Bismarck, the man and the statesman: being the reflections and reminiscences of Otto, Prince von Bismarck. 1898. Vol. II. p. 255-256.

In the half-century prior to the First World War, some Hungarians encouraged Turanism as a means of uniting Turks and Hungarians against the perils posed by the Slavs and Pan-Slavism. However Pan-Turanism was never more than an outrider to the more prevalent Pan-Turkist movement. Turanism helped in the creation of the important Turkish-Austro-Hungarian and Bulgarian-Austro-Hungarian military and strategic alliances.

The movement received impetus after Hungary's defeat in World War I. Under the terms of the Treaty of Trianon (1920.VI.4.), the new Hungarian state constituted only 32.7 percent of the territory of historic, pre-treaty Hungary, and lost 58.4 percent of its total population. More than 3.2 million ethnic Hungarians, one-third of all Hungarians resided outside the new boundaries of Hungary, in the successor states, under oppressive conditions. Old Hungarian cities of great cultural importance like Pozsony, Kassa, Kolozsvár were lost. Under these circumstances no Hungarian government could survive without seeking justice for Magyars and Hungary. Reuniting the Magyars became a crucial point in public life and on the political agenda. Public sentiment became strongly anti-Western, anti-French, and anti-British. Outrage led many to reject Europe and turn towards the East in search of new friends and allies in a bid to revise the terms of the treaty and restore Hungarian power.

"Disappointment towards Europe caused by 'the betrayal of the West in Trianon', and the pessimistic feeling of loneliness, led different strata in society towards Turanism. They tried to look for friends, kindred peoples and allies in the East so that Hungary could break out of its isolation and regain its well deserved position among the nations. A more radical group of conservative, rightist people, sometimes even with an anti-Semitic hint propagated sharply anti-Western views and the superiority of Eastern culture, the necessity of a pro-Eastern policy, and development of the awareness of Turanic racialism among Hungarian people.” in: Uhalley, Stephen and Wu, Xiaoxin eds.: China and Christianity. Burdened Past, Hopeful Future. 2001. p. 219.

Turanism never became official, because it was out of accord with the Christian conservatist ideological background of the regime. But it was used by the government as an informal tool to break the country's international isolation, and build alliances. Hungary signed treaties of friendship and collaboration with the Republic of Turkey in 1923, with the Republic of Estonia in 1937, with the Republic of Finland in 1937, with Japan in 1938, with Bulgaria in 1941.

In Transylvania, "Turanist ethnographers and folklorists privileged the peasants' cultural 'uniqueness', locating a cultural essence of Magyarness in everything from fishing hooks and methods of animal husbandry to ritual folk songs, archaic, 'individualistic' dances, spicy dishes and superstitions." This romantic nationalism was reminiscent of earlier movements seen in the Habsburg Monarchy following the Age of Enlightenment. According to the historian Krisztián Ungváry "With the awakening of Hungarian nationalism at the beginning of the 20th century, the question became topical again. The elite wanted to see itself as a military nation. The claims of certain linguistic researchers regarding the Finno-Ugric relationship were therefore strongly rejected, because many found the idea that their nation was related to a peaceful farming people (the Finns) as insulting... The extremist Turanians insisted on “ties of ancestry” with the Turkish peoples, Tibet, Japan and even the Sumerians, and held the view that Jesus was not a Jew but a Hungarian or a “noble of Parthia”."

=== Turanism and Hungarian fascism ===
According to Andrew C. János, while some Hungarian Turanists went as far as to argue that they were both racially healthier than and superior to other Europeans (including the Germans, because they believed that the Germans had been corrupted by Judaism), others felt more modestly, that as Turanians who were living in Europe, they might be able to provide an important bridge between East and West and they also might be able to play a role in world politics which would be out of proportion to both their numbers and the size of their country. This geopolitical argument was taken to absurd extremes by Ferenc Szálasi, the head of the Arrow Cross-Hungarist movement, who believed that, owing to their unique historical and geographical position, the Hungarians would be able to play a role which would be equal to, or even greater than, the role which Germany would play in the building of the new European order, while Szálasi's own charisma might eventually enable him to supersede Hitler as the leader of the international fascist movement.

Ferenc Szálasi, the leader of the Hungarian Arrow Cross Party, believed in the existence of a genuine Turanian-Hungarian race (to the extent that his followers conducted anthropological surveys and collected skull measurements) which was a crucial aspect of the development of his ideology of "Hungarism". Szálasi himself was a practicing Catholic but he wavered between a religious and a racial basis for Hungarism. The unique vocation of “Turanian” (Turkic) Hungary was its capacity to mediate between and unite the east and the west, Europe and Asia, the Christian Balkans and the Muslim Middle East, and from this, its ultimate vocation was stemmed, to spread its culture around the world and lead the world order by example, a task that neither Italy nor Germany was prepared to accomplish.

In recent years the contemporary neo-fascist scene in Hungary, the political party Jobbik has given credence to the Turanist ideology, although they have now reverted this position. For example in 2013 Gabor Vona stated in relationship to the then upcoming visit of Recep Tayyip Erdogan that, "As descendants of Turks, we value this visit".

== Turanism after 1945 ==
After the Second World War, the Soviet Red Army occupied Hungary. The Hungarian government was placed under the direct control of the administration of the occupying forces. All Turanist organisations were disbanded by the government, and the majority of Turanist publications were banned and all copies of them were confiscated. In 1948, Hungary was converted into a communist one-party state. Turanism was vilified and portrayed as an exclusively fascist ideology, although Turanism's role in the interwar development of far-right ideologies was negligible. The official prohibition of Turanism lasted until the collapse of the socialist regime in 1989.

== Turanism after 1989 ==
=== Christian Turanists ===
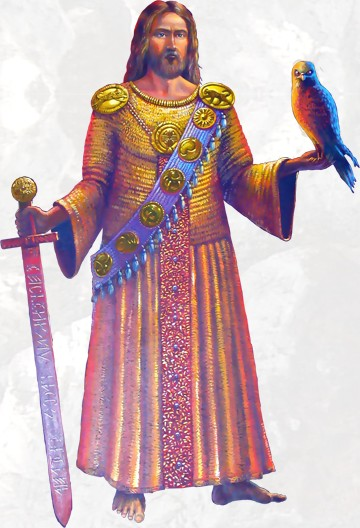
Jesus Christ as a Parthian-Hungarian warrior prince

A Hungarian non-commissioned officer named Ferenc Jós Badiny wrote his book Jézus Király, a pártus herceg (Hungarian: "King Jesus, the Parthian prince"), in which he invented the theory of Jesus the Parthian warrior prince. Many Christian Hungarian Turanists held the view that Jesus Christ was not a Jew. Instead, they believed that Jesus was a proto-Hungarian or a “noble of Parthia”. The theory of “Jesus, the Parthian prince” are such, or the revivification of real or supposed elements of priest-magicians of ancient “magic” Middle-Eastern world, shamanism, and pagan ancient Hungarian religion. Also, some Muslim Turkish Turanists held the view that Muhammad was not an Arab. Instead, they believed that Muhammad was a Sumerian, and according to the Turanist theses, they believed that the Sumerians were Turanid. By advocating these theories, Christian Turanists were able to deny Jesus's Jewish heritage and Christianity's Jewish roots by claiming that Jesus was a Turanian rather than a Jew and Christianity's roots originated in the teachings of the ancient Middle-Eastern mystery religions and the ancient pagan Hungarian beliefs rather than the teachings of Judaism. Both the Catholic and Protestant religious leaders of Hungary denounced this theory as heresy.

The Jobbik party and its former president Gábor Vona are uncompromising supporters of Turanism (the ideology of Jobbik considers Hungarians a Turanian nation).

=== Hungary's accession to the Organization of Turkic States ===
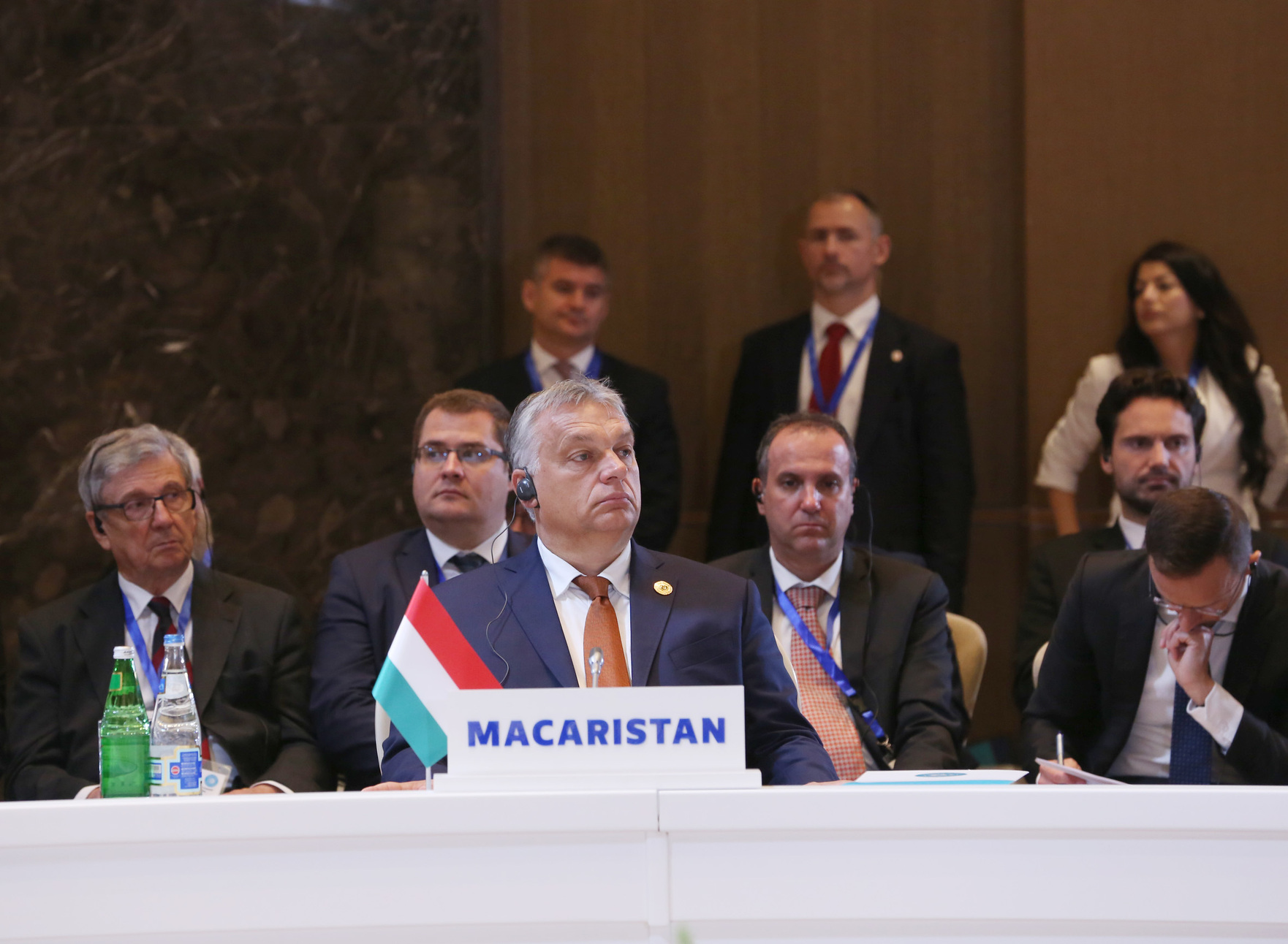
Viktor Orbán during the 7th Summit of Cooperation Council of Turkic-Speaking States in Baku

Since 2014 Hungary has had observer status at the General Assembly of Turkic-speaking States, and in 2017 it submitted an application for accession to the International Turkic Academy. During the 6th Summit of Turkic Council, Viktor Orbán said that Hungary is seeking even closer cooperation with the Turkic Council. In 2018, Hungary obtained its observer status in the council. In 2021, Orbán mentioned that the Hungarian and Turkic peoples share a historical and cultural heritage "reaching back many long centuries". He also pointed out that the Hungarian people are "proud of this heritage, and "were also proud when their opponents in Europe mocked them as barbarian Huns and Attila's people". In 2023, during his visit to Kazakhstan, Orbán said that Hungarians come to Kazakhstan "with great pleasure" because the two nations are connected by "millennial common roots".

== Great Kurultáj ==
The Great Kurultáj is a tribal assembly which is based on the common heritage of the peoples of Central Asia, a heritage which was nomadic in origin. (Azerbaijani, Bashkirs, Bulgarians, Buryats, Chuvash, Gagauz, Hungarians, Karachays, Karakalpaks, Kazakhs, Kyrgyz, Manchus, Mongols, Nogai, Tatars, Turks, Turkmen, Uighurs, Üzbeks, Yakuts etc.) It is also a popular tourist attraction in Hungary (from late 2000s) and Central Asia. The first Kurultáj was in Kazakhstan in 2007 and the last one was organized in 2022 at Bugac, Hungary.

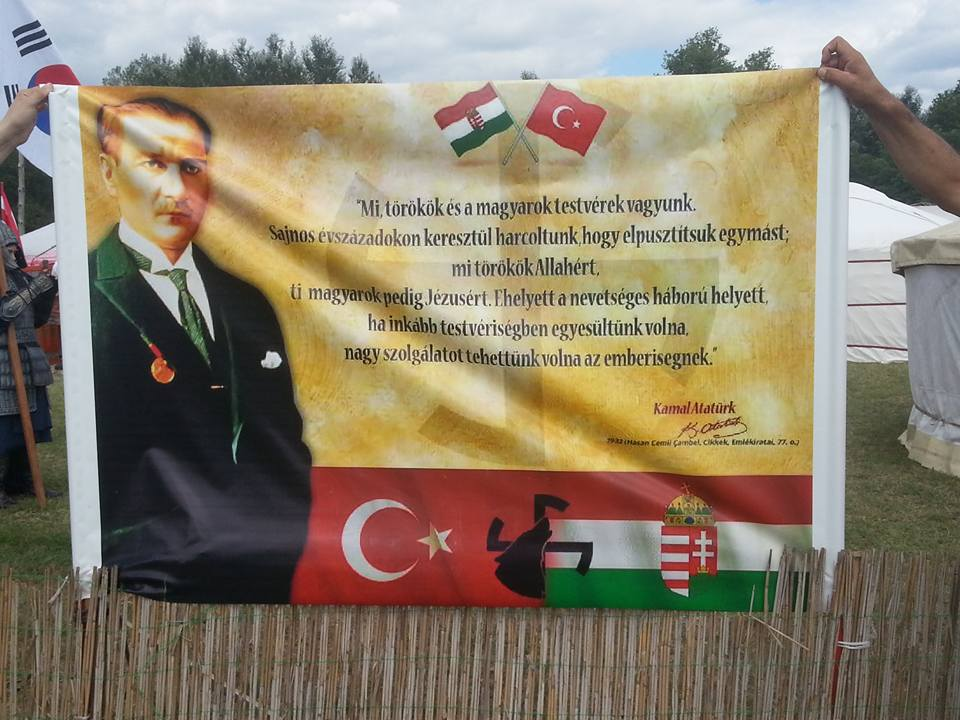
A banner used at a contemporary Great Kurultáj event.

Since the 1990s, a well developed souvenir and merchandise business has grown around Turanism, traditionalist and historical reenactment groups, which are quite similar to other well known international examples of this kind of business. According to the opinion of the Hungarian researcher Igaz Levente, this merchandise industry which has grown around modern Hungarian Turanism, became a kind of business, which he called "Szittya biznisz" (Scythian business), and it does not have much to do with ancient Hungarian traditions.

== Pseudoscholarly theories ==
Certain supporters of Hungarian Turanism have been characterized as promoters of pseudoscholarly theories. According to these theories, Hungarians share supposed Ural-Altaic origins with Bulgarians, Estonians, Mongols, Finns, Turkic peoples, and even Japanese people and Koreans. Origins of the Hungarian people with the Huns, Scythians or even Sumerians have been suggested by proponents of these theories. Such beliefs gained widespread support in Hungary in the interwar period. Though since widely discredited, these theories have regained support among certain Hungarian political parties, in particular among Jobbik and certain factions of Fidesz.

== See also ==
- Curse of Turan
- Pál Teleki
- Turanism (a similar Turkic ideology)
- Hungarian nationalism
- Hungarian neopaganism
- Ignác Goldziher
- Hungarian-Turkish Friendship Park
- Jobbik
- Ottoman occupation of Hungary (1541–1699)
