= Franz Migerka =

Franz Migerka (20 September, 1828 in Reintal, Lower Austria – 21 February, 1915 in Vienna) was a prominent Austrian museologist.

Migerka was employed by the Austrian Ministry of Trade at the end of the nineteenth century. He was responsible for a special exhibition on women at work for the Vienna World Fair.

His daughter was the poet and novelist Helene Migerka.
