= Hungarian Neopaganism (movement) =

New religious movement

Two-barred crosses symbolise the tree of life in Hungarian Neopaganism.

Hungarian Neopaganism, or the Hungarian Native Faith (Hungarian: Ősmagyar vallás), is a modern Pagan new religious movement aimed at representing an ethnic religion of the Hungarians, inspired by Taltosism (Hungarian belief system with shamanistic and animistic elements), ancient mythology and later folklore.

The Hungarian Neopaganism movement has roots in 18th- and 19th-century Enlightenment and Romantic elaborations, and early-20th-century ethnology. The construction of a national Hungarian religion was endorsed in interwar Turanist circles (1930s–1940s), and, eventually, Hungarian Neopagan movements blossomed in Hungary after the fall of the Soviet Union.

The boundaries between Hungarian Neopagan groups often relate to differing beliefs relating to the ethnogenesis of the Hungarians, generally believed to have originated on the Asian Steppe. Some Hungarian Neopaganistic groups sought to reconstruct their native faith based upon contemporary ideas about Scythian, Persian, and Sumerian religions and cultivate Turanist links with Turkic cultures.

Besides the elaborations developed within intellectual circles, the grassroots development of the Hungarian Neopaganism largely relies upon the work of individual shamans or neoshamans, the táltos, whom have become popular in Hungary since the 1980s. Some Hungarian Neopagan organisations are supported by political parties of the right-wing, including Fidesz and Jobbik.

== Overview and essential features ==
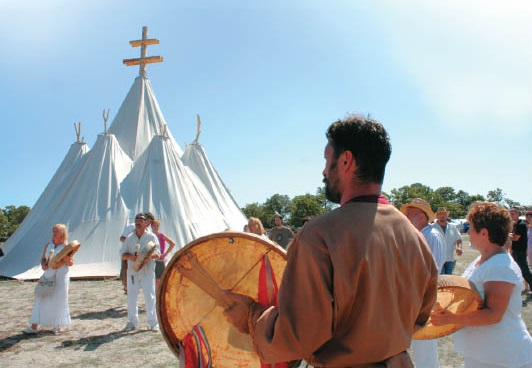
Ritual performed at the Temple of the Seven Images of the Mother of God.

=== Roots of Hungarian Neopaganism ===
Since the eighteenth and the nineteenth centuries, throughout the Enlightenment and especially Romanticism, the study of the ancient religion of the Hungarians has been tied together with the debate about their ethnogenesis and the nature of their language. This search for the origins of the Hungarians has continued to be productive well into the twentieth century, especially as a means to build a strong national identity. According to scholars, this search was fueled by the experience of the Hungarians under foreign powers, namely the Austrian and Soviet dominations. The theme of a national Hungarian religion was also dear to Hungarian Turanist circles in the 1930s and the 1940s, who looked for evidences to demonstrate a kinship between the Hungarian and Turkic peoples, and generally the origins of these "Turanian" populations in Central Asia. The Protestant priest Béla Muraközy, writing in 1921, forebode that Turanism, with its anti-Western slants and its fascination with the Orient, would have taken a religious direction trying to resurrect "ancient paganism". When Hungary was occupied by Soviet forces in 1945, many Turanists emigrated to Western countries and continued to work there on their ideas, to reintroduce them to Hungary starting in the 1990s, after the collapse of the Soviet Union.

Theories about Scythian and Sumerian origins were supported by many Turanist ethnologists. At the turn of the twentieth century, the first to popularise the notion of a Turanian linguistic family inclusive of Hungarian and Sumerian was Gyula Ferenczy. In the post-war period, a direct filiation of the Hungarians from the Sumerians was theorised by Tibor Baráth, Victor Padányi, András Zakar, and especially Ida Bobula, though the most well-known supporter of the theory is Ferenc Badinyi-Jós, who emigrated to Argentina, according to whom the original undivided Sumerian-Hungarian ethnicity was based on the Carpathian Mountains. The theory has left a lasting influence in the Hungarian Native Faith movement, as Badinyi-Jós was among the first to propose the constitution of an ethnic "Hungarian Church". Other scholars proposed the kinship of the Hungarians with Hebrews, Persians, ancient Egyptians, and others even with Japanese, Chinese, Greeks, and other peoples.

Already in 1770, János Sajnovics demonstrated the relationship of Hungarian with Uralic languages, with the publication of the Demonstratio idioma Ungarorum et Lapponum idem esse. In the nineteenth century, with new studies on folklore, academic circles welcomed the idea that ancient Hungarian religion was essentially shamanic, related to Uralic and Siberian traditions. In the meantime, Arnold Ipolyi, bishop of Oradea, published his monumental work Magyar Mythológia (Hungarian Mythology), finished in 1854, aimed at matching the Brothers Grimm's Deutsche Mythologie.

In the 1960s, Mátyás Jenő Fehér, another emigrant to Argentina who was a church-historian and former Dominican, provided a seminal view for a post-Christian Hungary. From 1967, he published several books about the Kassai Kódex or Collectio Dominicana. He claimed that in 1944 he had found in Kosice a previously unknown medieval codex with records from inquisition courts. The codex documented a centuries-long effort by the Christian church to exterminate the taltoses, Hungarian shamans, the representatives of the pre-Christian Hungarian religion whose role was to preserve the integrity of the nation. Though it is considered a forgery by academic scholarship, the document is among the reference points for proponents of the Hungarian Native Faith to illustrate the high morality of the indigenous religion and of its representatives.

=== Taltosism ===
"Taltosism" is a Hungarian belief system with shamanistic and animistic elements. It is practised by the táltos (English plural "taltoses"), that is to say the Hungarian equivalent to shamans in shamanism, or kams in Tengrism. It is essential to the Hungarian Native Faith movement. Hungarian chronicles of the 13th century still reported about "magicians" (taltoses) who practised their rites for the welfare of society. Hungarian taltosism persisted until the World War II in rural areas, where certain people were still considered taltoses by the local communities, though they practiced weather-magic only.

Ideas about an ethnic Hungarian shamanism as a defining characteristic of the Hungarian essence were studied within a psychoanalytic framework by Géza Róheim in the 1920s, and later by Vilmos Diószegi with field work in Siberia in the 1950s and the 1960s. The shamanic character of the original Hungarian religion is accepted by most contemporary scholars, and has been the focus of most new studies.

==== Study of the taltoses ====
Diószegi described taltoses as specialists who are able of going through a controlled ecstasy (rejtezés). One becomes a taltos by heredity or vocation, and the process of becoming one includes the typical stages of psychophysical disease, acceptance and healing: After an initial resistance to vocation and the various symptoms of the "shamanic disease", the chosen by the gods finally accepts his role and is endowed with his powers. Taltoses acquire superior knowledge at a young age—usually at seven—, through shamanic journeys taking place in days-long dreams, in which the main goal is to climb the égig érő fa ("sky-high tree"), also called élet fa ("tree of life"), világ fa ("world tree") or tetejetlen fa ("tree without a top"). Diószegi considered many elements of Hungarian taltosism to be peculiar to the Hungarian ethnicity, not to be found in Central Asian shamanic traditions. He described the role of the taltos as the "recognition and accomplishment of things required by the community, but unresolved due to the limitation of its own [the community's] powers".

Contemporary Hungarian religious studies, primarily the academic circle revolving around Mihály Hoppál, has acquired an important role for the international study of shamanism. The Hungarian ethnological discourse presents taltoses, and shamans in general, as those whose socio-religious role is to heal, prophesize and keep the integrity of cultural traditions by connecting the past and the present and thus projecting into the future, integrating the individual and the community, mankind and the gods. In the words of Hoppál, shamanism is depicted as a "bridge and symbol, because it interconnects the traditions of the past with the present, and anchors the future of traditions". The shaman's tasks are "leading the community, guarding the ethnic consciousness, being a (sacrificial) priest".

==== Modern taltosism ====
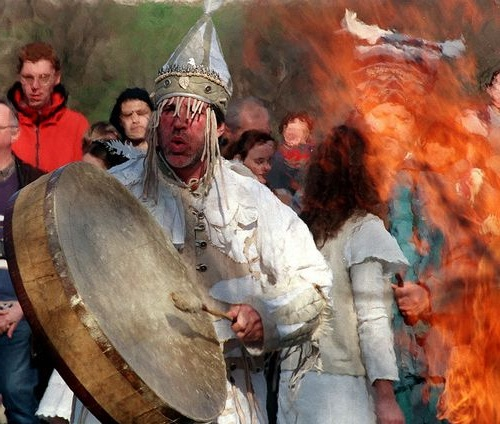
A modern taltos performing a ritual with his drum, in front of a fire.

The modern taltos movement started in the 1980s, developing links with Michael Harner and other representatives of core shamanism from the United States since 1986. However, there are significant differences between American neoshamanism and Hungarian modern taltosism. While the American movement aims at representing a trans-cultural technique, designed as adaptable to different cultural contexts, and focused on self-empowerment and healing application, Hungarian taltosism is first and foremost an ethnic religious technique. Mihály Hoppál supported the taltos revival in his country as a means for consolidating a Hungarian Native Faith, and therefore for ethnic rejuvenation.

Congregations of taltoses and their followers hold weekly ritual and healing gatherings, and they organise pilgrimages to holy sites. Rituals practised by Hungarian Native Faith practitioners include rituals of initiation and passage, and rituals for fertility, healing and purification, either for the environment, the community of believers, or the entire Hungarian nation. They may involve sweat lodges, fire-walk, drumming, and techniques of meditation. While the ceremonies are usually led by taltoses, the community of believers is actively involved.

Among well-known modern taltoses there are Zoltán Nagy Sólyomfi, István Somogyi, Fehérholló Öskü, and András Kovács-Magyar. Other mediators of the tradition are Imré Máté, Attila Heffner, Tamás Hervay, and Gábor Szemző. Although they belong to different organisations, they agree on the monotheism of Hungarian Native Faith's theology and on the role of the taltos. According to them, the taltos functions as "the bridge between the celestial and the earthly worlds, between the irrational and the rational, the endless and the finite". Taltoses are interpreters of the transcendent.

According to Attila Heffner's definition:

Taltoses opened up, expanded their consciousness to this world, which is not perceivable in a normal state of the mind. During the so-called soul-journey ... they brought answers to questions, healing to diseases, seeing events of past and future, with the help of a purposive, goal-oriented action in this broader horizon of the existing world.

Taltoses share their knowledge acting as instructors, teaching their ideas in organised frameworks (for instance Sólyomfi's School of the Ancient Source or Kovács' Taltos School), through lectures or in discussion circles. The techniques for getting in touch with the transcendent (révülés) take place through an active participation in ceremonies and rituals. Taltoses are religious specialists, and their role of healers is particularly pronounced; for instance, exercises of directed meditation, induced by drumming, to eliminate harmful thoughts, play a prominent role in their practice.

In their responsibility for the entire nation, and their role as keepers and awakeners of the national essence, modern taltoses often claim connection with the royal House of Árpád—the first dynasty to rule Hungary—and with Jesus, reinterpreted as a shamanic figure. According to Attila Heffner:

[While] the shamanic quality is characteristic of the system of universal human culture, ... the taltos is specifically the guardian and executive of the Hun, Székely and Hungarian human world and traditions. Whereas a shaman can be a member of any culture ... a taltos pronouncedly exists in accordance with the spirituality of our Hungarian culture saturated in the appreciation of Jesus.

=== Scriptures ===
Within the Hungarian Native Faith movement, two mythopoetic texts have become the bases of two concurrent streams of religious doctrine. These texts are the Arvisura written by Zoltán Paál, and the Yotengrit four-books collection written by Imre Máté. Mythopoetic themes from both the works have more recently been synthesised in other media, such as the long animated film Sons of Heaven (Az Ég fiai, 2010). Another long animation influenced by Hungarian Native Faith narratives, this time based on ethnographic and historical data from the Uralic paradigm and realised with subsidy from the national government, is the Song of the Miraculous Hind (Ének a csodaszarvasról, 2002).

Zoltán Paál (1913–1982) was a steelworker who, during the Second World War, was initiated by a Siberian Mansi shaman named Tura Salavare, whom was then soldier in the Red Army. Paál compiled the knowledge he acquired in the Arvisura, which tells the history of the Hunnic tribes starting from a mythical prehistory, to their settling of Mesopotamia and then Ordos, and finally to Matthias Corvinus. The book draws elements from Uralic traditions.

The Yotengrit is more religious-philosophical in its message. Its author Imre Máté was the taltos, or bácsa, founder of the Yotengrit Church. The work claims to represent the faithful transmission of the ancient knowledge preserved by people in the Rábaköz region of western Hungary, the heritage of the so-called "Büün-religion", the persecuted original faith of the Hungarians. The work and especially the Prophecy of Nyirka which it contains, an allegorical text supposed to forebode the future of Hungary and global politics, has become a stronghold for nationalism and far-right occultism.

== Hungarian Native Faith churches ==
There are a variety of Hungarian Native Faith churches reflecting the movement's internal diversity. These churches differ from each other in both their doctrines and the character of their activities. They often develop from local taltos-led communities, or are individually established by a taltos. These taltoses are considered by their followers valid spiritual leaders and while some practise only within the boundaries of their local communities, others have acquired a national reputation. Their popular acknowledgement depends on attributed ritual and healing efficacy.

There are churches which base their doctrines on an outspoken synthesis of different traditions, and churches which claim to represent purely native traditions. In the first group there are the Church of Esoteric Doctrines (Ezoterikus Tanok Egyháza) or Church of the Holy Crown (Szent Korona Egyház)—founded in 1996 and officially registered by the Hungarian state in 1997—, the Church of the Universe (Univerzum Egyháza) of Giörgy Péter Pál Kisfaludy, and the Ancient Hungarian Taltos Church of András Kovács. Most of the others fall within the second category, including the Community of Hungarian Religion of Attila Kovács, the Ancient Hungarian Church of László Hjadú Nimród, the Yotengrit Church of Imre Máté, the Firebird Taltos Drum Circle of Zoltán Sólyomfi, the People of Árpád Drumming Circle of Lehel Bakonyi, and the Traditional Church of the Order of Árpád. The most influential among them have been the Yotengrit Church and the Ancient Hungarian Taltos Church.

Besides these taltos-led groups there are taltoses who do not have a community and yet are regarded as the most charismatic figures of Hungarian Native Faith. They include Attila Heffner, Tamás Hervay the "Soul-Lifting Taltos", and János Majercsik Oguz.

=== András Kovács' Ancient Hungarian Taltos Church ===
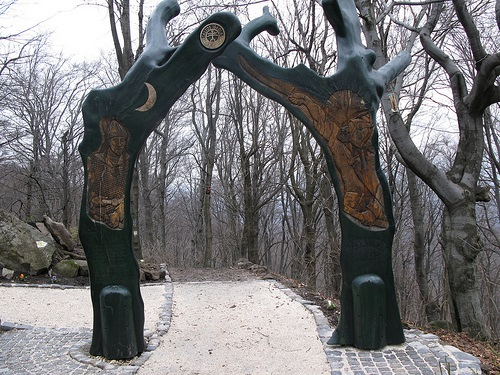
Gateway of the Noetic Taltos School.

The Ancient Hungarian Taltos Church (Ősmagyar Táltos Egyház) founded by András Kovács, a disciple of Kisfaludy, teaches a Hungarian Native Faith doctrine which it claims to be the original religion of the Huns. According to the church, God the Father is an energetic vibration which incarnated in a host, the Mother of God, begetting the Sun God (of whom Jesus is a representation). The Pilis Mountains are a holy place according to the Ancient Hungarian Taltos Church. Kovács is also the founder and director of the Noetic Taltos School (Szellemi Táltos Iskola).

=== Attila Kovács' Community of the Hungarian Religion ===
The Community of the Hungarian Religion (Magyar Vallás Közössége) inherits those scholarly studies of the nineteenth century which claimed that Hungarian and Sumerian language share an origin in the hypothetical Turanian linguistic family. Based on these ideas, in the 1930s Zoltán Bencsi founded the Turanian Monotheist Movement. After Miklós Horthy's government banned the organisation, some members went abroad. Among them was Ótto János Homonnay, who in the 1960s, in Canada, established the Hungarian Turul Society to promote the Turanist theses. In 1979, after Homonnay's death, János Páll took over the leadership of the group. eventually this group divided and another group was formed under the direction of Albin István Zalezsák, who authored the work, ISA-TEN TAN (Magyar Isme), published in Toronto in 1986.

The Community of Hungarian Religion was founded in Hungary in 1992 as a continuation of the Turul Society. The current leader is Attila Kovács, according to whom the church already had gathered around one thousand members in the late 1990s. The church is not distinctively anti-Christian, but considered the adoption of Christianity by King Stephen I in 1000 CE a disaster which brought about the destruction of authentic Hungarian religious culture. The church endorses the hypothesis of the kinship of Hungarians and Sumerians, and supports the use of the Old Hungarian alphabet instead of the Latin script.

=== Imre Máté's Yotengrit Church ===
The Yotengrit Church (Yotengrit Egyház), whose complete name is the Church of the Ancient Spirit of the Endless Sea (Tengervégtelen Ős-Szellem Egyháza), was founded around 2007 by Imre Máté. He, whose title in the organisation was bácsa ("master"), emigrated to Germany in 1956, during the revolution against the communist government of the Hungarian People's Republic in which he participated. While in Germany, he worked as a businessman and poet, but returned to Hungary in the 2000s to spend his last years in Bágyogszovát. He founded the Yotengrit Church as the representative of the ancient Hungarian religion, the so-called "Büün-religion", passed down through the unwritten tradition of the tudó ("knower") people along the Raba river. Máté published a series of nine books, entitled Yotengrit, in which he explained theology and linguistic etymology. In recent years, the Yotengrit Church has become one of the most influential organisations of the Hungarian Native Faith. While it is considered by its adherents as a faithful heir of the pre-Christian Hungarian belief systems, it shows various non-indigenous influences.

The theology of the Yotengrit Church emphasises a conception of primordial God, called Yotengrit, Tengrit or Tengri, which represents all the deities in their yet undivided state. In Hungarian the related word tenger means "sea", and represents such primordial undifferentiation. The primordial God then manifests as a male–female duality: Ukkó, the mother goddess whose forehead is decorated by the moon, and who is identified as the Boldogasszony (the "Blessed Lady") of Christianised folk beliefs; and Gönüz, the sun-faced father god.

At the time of the foundation of the church, Imre Máté proclaimed the importance of an all-encompassing conception of God:

In this Hungarian religion, it is very important that God is a very abstract concept; a spiritual power. He cannot be simply impersonated; whenever he was impersonated—Gönüz, Ukkó or Boldogasszony—it was always the result of human imagination.

At the same time, the theology emphasises a national god peculiar to the Hungarians, Má-Tun, the deified hero of the folk tale entitled Fehérlófia ("Son of the White Horse"), who was originally a totemic animal ancestor. Má-Tun is identified with the historical figure of Maodu, founder of the first Xiongnu empire, and according to Máté also of the empire of the Huns. The Yotengrit Church is politically neutral, but, as Máté's stated, its teachings may be a "source of sane, aggression-free national politics".

=== László Nimród's Ancient Hungarian Church ===
The Ancient Hungarian Church (Ősmagyar Egyház), whose Hungarian headquarters are located in Mogyoród, was first established in Budapest in the 1990 by László Hajdú Nimród, and was officially registered in 1998. Nimród spends most of the year in the United States and the church has international headquarters located in Los Angeles. The doctrine of the Ancient Hungarian Church is a synthesis of ancient Hungarian, East Asian and Christian beliefs, though all of them are claimed to be original Hungarian-Turanian beliefs. The church has strict religious regulations. For instance, preachers have to wear white and purple clothes with folk patterns. They celebrate the major holidays of the Christian calendar, winter and summer solstice, national holidays and the birthdays of important Hungarian historical personages.

=== Zoltán Sólyomfi's Firebird Taltos Drum Circle ===
The Firebird Taltos Drum Circle (Tűzmadár Táltos Dobkör) was founded in 2006 by Zoltán Nagy Sólyomfi, who also acted as the chief executive of the Yotengrit Church when it was registered by the government. He later left the Yotengrit Church for undisclosed internal disputes and, despite his wish to return, was not allowed to do so by Máté. The aim of the group is to revive ancient Hungarian spirituality, mediating it to society in modern forms, helping the individuals to understand themselves and thus healing the world tree, which manifests itself through the individuals.

The theology of the Drum Circle is "based upon the ancient Hungarian conception of the world, which is the One (God) which incorporates everything that exists". Sólyomfi teaches that there are two worlds: One is the "manifest world" represented by the world tree, while the other one is the "unmanifested, unshaped space" which contains the "shared consciousness" of mankind.

The Drum Circle emphasises practice over doctrine, including drumming, breathing and voice techniques. The aim of these practices is to widen one's consciousness to understand the operations of the One, becoming like the One. The group practises ritual ceremonies for birth, initiation, marriage, death and the feasts of the Yearly Round. The School of the Ancient Source (Ősforrás Iskola), associated with the church, organises camps and pilgrimages.

=== Traditional Church of the Order of Árpád ===
The Traditional Church of the Order of Árpád (Árpád Rendjének Jogalapja Tradicionális Egyház) was founded in 2009 and has its reference points in the Turanist emigree ideologists Adorján Magyar and Victor Padányi, but it is also inspired by the Traditionalist School, the Nouvelle Droite of Alain de Benoist, and to the reconstructed Proto-Indo-European religion.

=== Gaffer Bolya's Nest ===
The group named Bolyanest (Gaffer Bolya's Nest) was founded in 1979 by Gaffer Bolya, a teacher in vocational secondary school titled Bolyapó within the group itself. Bolya's starting aim was to provide a way of good life for his students, whom formed the original core members of the group. The centre of the movement is in Budapest, and it was registered by the government in 1999. It is considered amongst the most influential Hungarian Native Faith movements today, especially concerning the process of re-mythologisation of Hungarian history. The group was originally focused on nature religion, while in the most recent decades its focus has shifted to the discourse about ethnic roots.

Bolya acts as the group's ceremonial leader. The group has a core membership of around one hundred people, but its influence reaches the thousands of people. They are mostly from Budapest's middle class, but there are also farmers, entrepreneurs and intellectuals. The average age is over fifty-five and most of them are highly educated. They outspokenly identify themselves as non-Christians, though they do not presume to be the continuators of a well-defined pre-Christian religion; rather, they consciously construct a new religion based on Hungarian folklore and elements from other cultures' indigenous religions. Sumerian culture has been one of the main sources, although other cultures are explored too; for instance, Sumerian prayers are sung together with Russian songs. They regard some natural sites surrounding Budapest and farther localities such as Sóskút, Borsodgeszt, and Bodrogköz, as their holy places where to make pilgrimage.

A fundamental teaching of Bolya is the conceptual distinction between "order" and "system", which remains the core of Bolyanest's thought. The former, the order, defines the natural way of being of everything in nature; everything is interconnected and interdependent, and each single part has a role in its instinctual cooperation with the others. The latter, the system, defines unnatural and artificial superstructures which take shape in societies when individuals and groups are surrounded by growing webs of norms, and are gradually alienated from each other and from their natural contexts. Gaffer Bolya was likely inspired by his studies of Jean-Jacques Rousseau's and Leo Tolstoy's thought in the development of this vision.

== Identity and politics ==
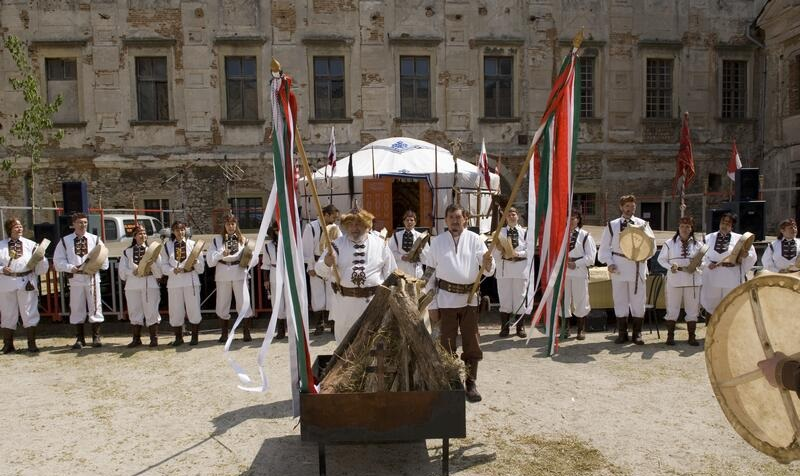
Gathering of a Hungarian Native Faith group for the performance of a ritual. The two leading figures hold ritual spears with strips of cloth of the colours of the flag of Hungary tied near the tips.

=== Nationalism and anti-multiculturalism ===
Hungarian Native Faith groups generally put a great emphasis on the discourse about ethnic roots, which are re-mythologised. Many Hungarian Native Faith groups espouse nationalistic political views and organise their communities in exclusive ways, exhibiting political intolerance. At the same time, pluralism and multiculturalism are viewed as disturbances which erode Hungarian identity. The popularity of these stances is attributed by scholars to the abrupt fall of the Iron Curtain, followed by spiritual vacuum and the perception of being invaded by a "multi-faceted cultural market", which created an identity crisis in post-Soviet countries. In the case of Hungarian Native Faith groups, this resulted in a rejection of postmodern heterogeneity and a sacralisation of the national identity, in which language, religion and politics form a single entity. Hungarian Native Faith groups see themselves as a core minority, amongst all Hungarians, which represents the quintessence of Hungarianness.

=== Relationship with Christianity ===
The relationship between Hungarian Native Faith and Christianity varies from church to church. Some Hungarian Native Faith groups use Christian themes and terminology in their own doctrines, or propose the incorporation of Christianity itself into the Hungarian Native Faith, such as in the case of groups developing in the wake of the teachings of Ferenc Badinyi-Jós. Others, like the Community of Hungarian Religion and the Bolyanest, are instead outspokenly anti-Christian.

A fundamental notion in Hungarian Native Faith is that each "nation" should have its own "faith", and a "Christian Hungary" represents an anomaly which needs to be rectified. This rectification should come from a liquidation of Christianity. Even among those Hungarian Native Faith groups which nourish warm feelings towards Jesus, regarded as compatible with the indigenous religion, including the Yotengrit Church, the Christian religious institution as it developed after Jesus—the so-called "Pauline Christianity"—is in any case perceived as a corrupt entity to be dismantled. More in particular, among these groups it is Eastern Christianity to be valued as compatible with the indigenous religion, and to be considered closer to what Jesus intended, while Western Christianity (the forms which have historically been dominant in Hungary) is seen as its antithesis and as a deviant, evil teaching. In these groups, Jesus is reinterpreted as a powerful ancestor and shaman.

Within the Bolyanest, most of the members deem Christianity a superstition aimed at the control of people. Christian symbolic motifs such as the cross and the tree of life are appropriated and treated, together with the sun and the moon, as symbols of natural pre-Christian religion which were later appropriated by the Christian churches. The majority of believers regards Christianity as the force which eradicated this natural ancient knowledge, including original Hungarian religion, and as the force responsible for the disenchantment of the world.

=== Relationship with Central Asian Tengrism ===
Those taltoses who espouse Turanist theories sometimes declare explicit affiliation with Tengrism, the Turkic ethnic religion. This is the case of Zoltán Sólyomfi. These taltoses are generally characterised by their use of the Turkic name Tengri, instead of the Hungarian term Isten.

In 2012 a nine-meters high élet fa (tree of life) was donated by Hungarian Native Faith groups to the Tengrists of Kazakhstan. In the same year, Ojun Adigzsi See-Oglu, a shaman from Tuva, was invited to the Hungarian Parliament Building to perform a ritual dance around the Holy Crown of Hungary for the welfare of the Hungarian nation.

== See also ==
- Uralic neopaganism
- Tengrism
