= Aladár Körösfői-Kriesch =

Hungarian Art Nouveau painter

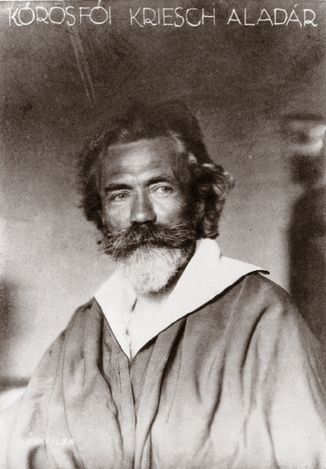
- Born: 29 October 1863; Buda, Hungary (today part of Budapest)
- Died: 16 June 1920 (aged 56); Budakeszi, Hungary
- Known for: Art Nouveau painter
- Movement: Gödöllő Art Colony
- Patrons: Bertalan Székely; Károly Lotz

Aladár Körösfői-Kriesch (29 October 1863 – 16 June 1920) was a Hungarian Art Nouveau painter.

He was born in Buda, the son of hydro-biologist and zoologist János Kriesch. He was a co-founder with Sándor Nagy of the Gödöllő Art Colony, which introduced Art Nouveau style (also called Secession) in Hungary.

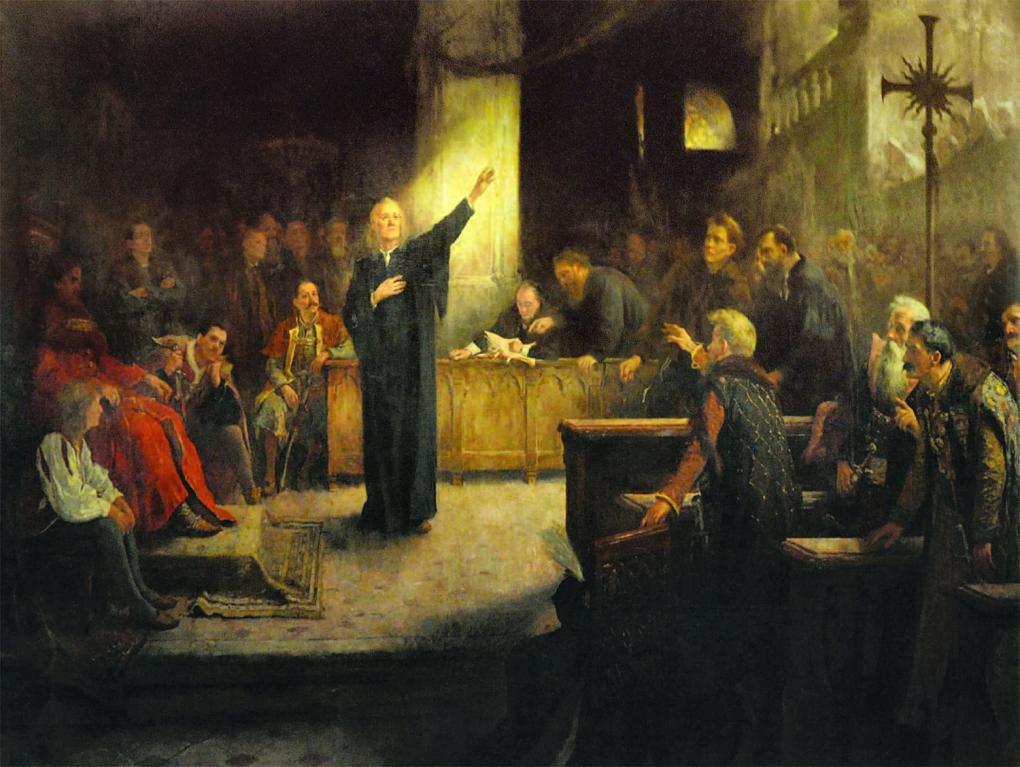
Ferenc Dávid's speech to the Diet of Turda in 1568 (circa 1896-1898)

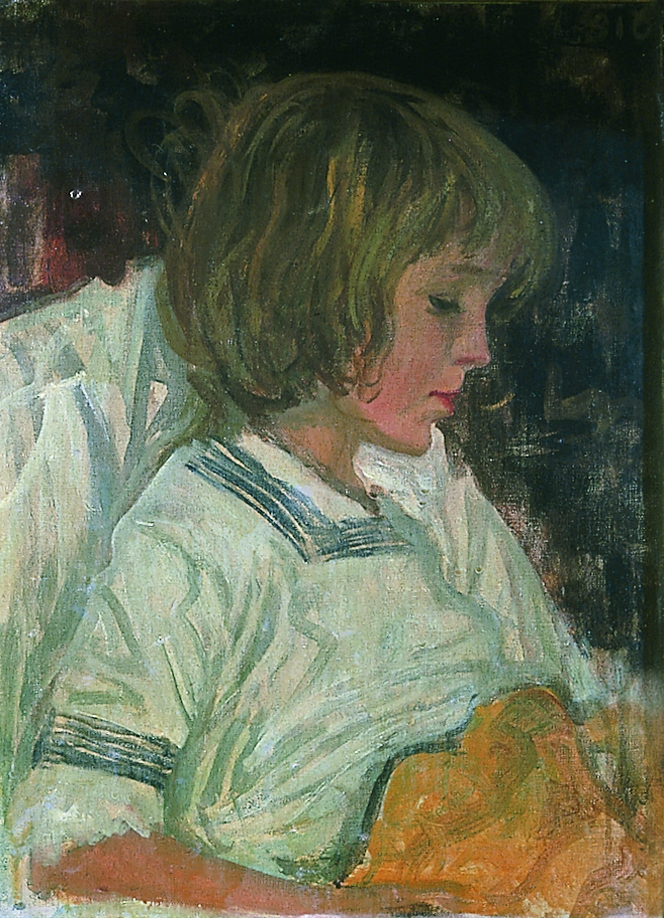
Tamás ill, Gödöllői Városi Múzeum

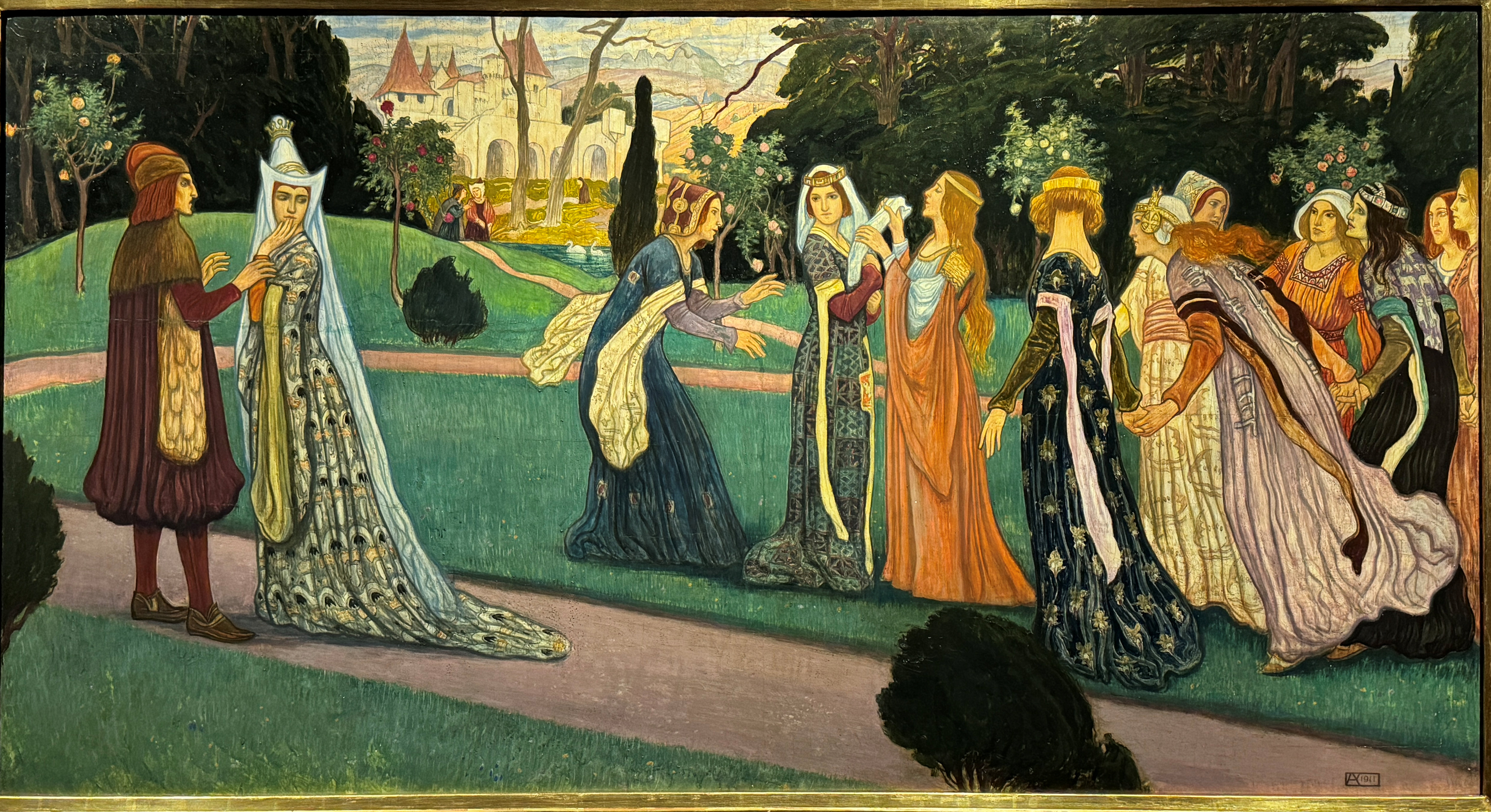
Story of Klára Zách (I), Hungarian National Gallery

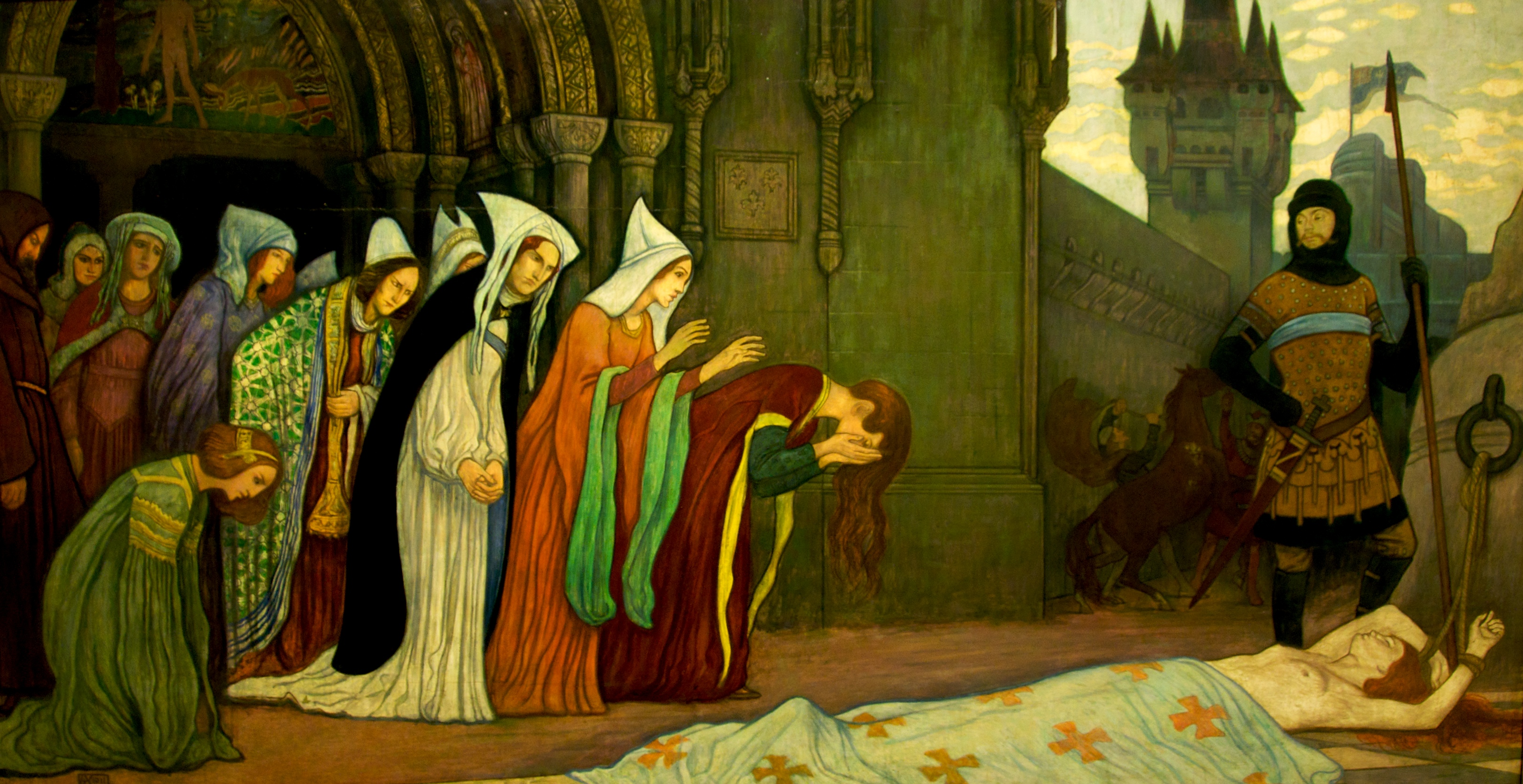
Story of Klára Zách (II) after her death, Hungarian National Gallery

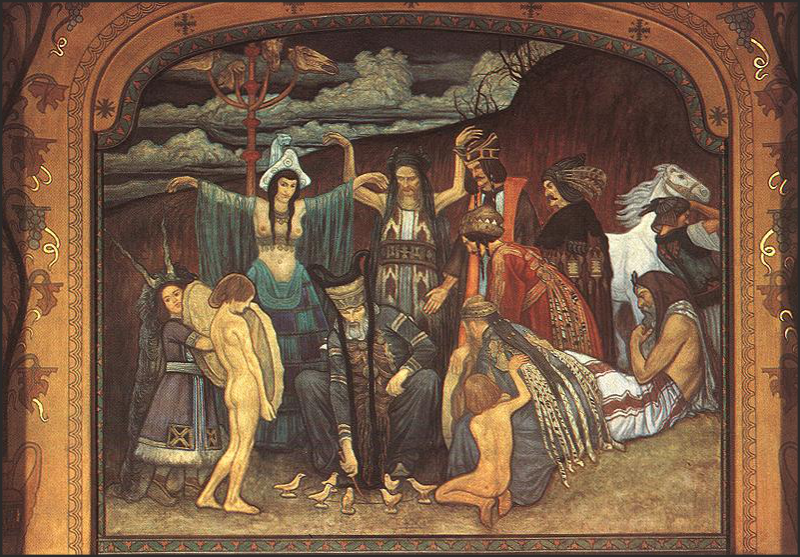
Circle Dance of Shamans, 1911

All Saints Day, 1914

== Bibliography ==
- Kovalovszky, Márta: A modern magyar festészet remekei: 1896-2003. Corvina, Budapest, 2005. "Körösfői-Kriesch Aladár" p. 23.;ISBN 963-13-5434-2
- Nagy, Sándor: Életünk Körösfői Kriesch Aladárral (Gödöllő, 2005.)
- Körösfői-Kriesch Aladár - Artportal
