= Táltos =

Shamanistic figure in Hungarian mythology

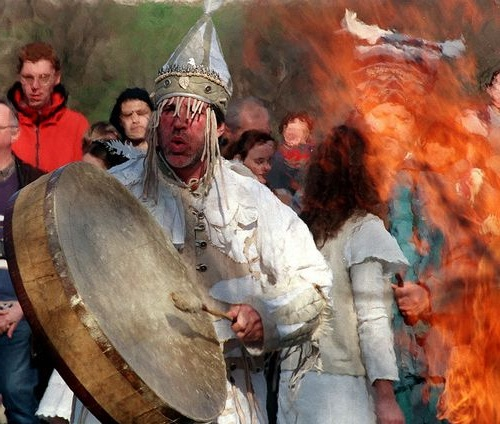
A Hungarian shaman reenactor

The táltos (Hungarian: [ˈtaːltoʃ]; also "tátos") is a figure in Hungarian mythology, a person with supernatural power who acts as a spiritual mediator, akin to a shaman in shamanism, or kam in Tengrism.

== Description ==
The most reliable account of the táltos is given by Roman Catholic priest Arnold Ipolyi in his collection of folk beliefs, Magyar mitológia (Hungarian mythology) (1854). A táltos would be chosen by the gods or spirits before birth or during childhood. People with teeth at birth, a sixth finger or other additional bones, or that had an "in the caul birth" were also often considered to be chosen.

If the extra bone broke or was stolen before the táltos turned 7, its abilities would be lost. Being a táltos could not be learned or taught; it could only happen through supernatural calling. Some beliefs hold that a táltos would have to be breastfed until it turned 7, which would grant it immense physical strength. (An example of this occurs in the archaic folk tale "Son of the White Mare".)

The most important ability of a táltos is a meditation or spiritual trance called "révülés" (verb: révül); in this state, he could heal wounds and sickness or learn hidden truths by "sending their soul among the stars". The táltos was chosen by gods or spirits for a specific calling in life and had the duty to communicate with the entire Hungarian nation in a time of danger, to warn against invading armies or an impending cultural collapse.

== Pagans ==
The painted ceiling of the church of Székelyderzs had a figure with six fingers; this was later renovated, "correcting" the picture to five fingers.

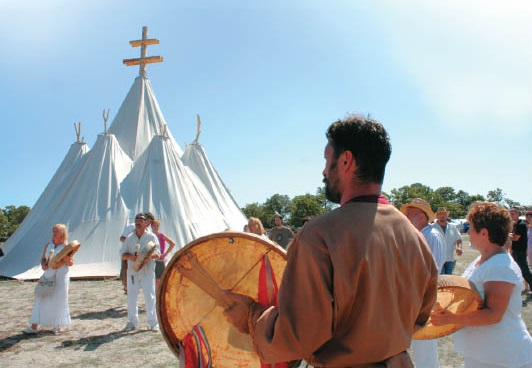
Hungarian Native Faith Ceremony

Post-Christianism Jesus Christ would sometimes be referred to as the égi táltos (or heavenly táltos).

== Origin of the word ==
The name "Táltos" may be connected to the verb "tált", which is to "open wide"; i.e. they "opened themselves to the world." More probable, however, is its cognation with Ugric words like Northern Mansi tūltėn "easy" and Vasyugan Khanty tolten "with magical powers". Yet another hypothesis suggests derivation from Turkic talt "unconsciousness".

== Göncöl and Kampó ==
In Hungarian folk tales táltos are common, such as Göncöl and Kampó.

Kampó was said to have had an "ice body" (jégtestű) and was short with thick legs. He lived in Temesvár (present-day Timișoara), ate lunch in Buda at the same table as King Matthias and was always poorly dressed. King Matthias was asked several times why a pauper was eating at the same table as the king, but King Matthias insisted on this tradition. When the Ottoman army attacked the Kingdom of Hungary, Kampó reportedly spilled fire from his mouth and he "fought with his iced body against Turkish metal", redeeming a "moonlike" ("holdas" = "eclipse") horse of King Matthias from the Turks.

Göncöl (also Döncöl, Güncü), on the other hand, had tremendous knowledge. He spoke with animals, understood the meanings of the stars, and invented the horse-coach. He was said to have a coach which was pulled by multiple horses that reportedly had its perch broken and bent. His death was not witnessed, but instead it was said that he simply "disappeared into the stars". The "coach of Göncöl" is visible in the night sky as Ursa Major (the "Great Bear"), where the tail of the bear is the perch of the coach.

== References in historiography ==
In the Chronicle of the Hungarians by Johannes de Thurocz, Attila of the Huns asked several táltos to foresee the outcome of Battle of Chalons, where they predicted that the war would be lost. They based their predictions on the intestines of animals, but how the actual prediction is done is not known.

The heritage of táltos kings can be found in several parts of Hungary and are linked mainly to kings of the Árpád dynasty. The most important is the chivalrous King Ladislaus; the name of his horse was Szög.

One legend says, that St. Stephen went hunting, but grew tired and took a nap under a tree. He had a dream (or révülés/meditation) of speaking with the head of the Pecheneg army. When he woke up, he knew they were preparing to attack, and he could take action to protect the country. According to this legend, St. Stephen himself was a táltos. These folk tales may have arisen later and not in the time of these pious Christian kings.

From the times of Matthias Corvinus, Galeotto Marzio writes: "you had a man of six fingers in your father's court". The horse of Matthias was "moonly" (holdas), referring to it as táltos horse.

There was a lawsuit in 1725, in Debrecen, where Erzsébet Balázsi, a well-known táltos at that time, was accused of being a witch. The court asked her to explain the role of táltos. She replied: the táltos cures, sees buried treasures with the naked eye, and "the táltos are fighting for Hungary in heaven".

There is a common belief that St. Stephen has persecuted the táltos during Christianisation of Hungary, but this is not linked to any fact. When pagan revolts started in 1046 and 1061 there were enough táltos for the leaders to choose for their court.

== The "táltos horse" ==
The táltos horse or steed ("táltos paripa") is the mount of the táltos, and also a stock character in Hungarian folk tales. (Here, "táltos" typically refers to the power of the horse and not necessarily its association with a shaman, though some folk heroes are identified as táltos themselves.)

The táltos steed would typically appear at first to the protagonist (usually a peasant's son, adventuring prince, or a youngest son) disguised as an old and ugly jade. If it is treated well, it would ask the hero to feed it hot cinders, whereupon its transform into a steed with golden coat, golden saddles and five or six legs. In this form it could fly with the protagonist on its back; its speed is mandatorily described as "faster than a bird", "faster than wind", and finally "faster than thought".

(As with Hungarian dragons and their heads, the number of legs may appear as other mythical numbers and the coat as other noble metals (in the usual order copper, silver and gold); a higher number/nobler metal implying greater power.)

According to some experts, the táltos horse is a symbol of the drum of the táltos. They heated it over fire (see hot cinders) to make it suitable to play and used the drum to meditate (fly away).

== Popular culture ==
- Taltos (1990) by Anne Rice is the third novel in the Lives of the Mayfair Witches trilogy. The character of the táltos is invoked in this gothic novel, where an ancient being with mystical powers plays a crucial role in the unfolding drama.
- The táltos is a prominent motif in the narrative of the 2020 Austrian-German gothic television series Freud.
- Mayfair Witches (2023) is an AMC television series based on Anne Rice’s trilogy, which features a modern take on the táltos figure. The series follows a young woman discovering her connection to a powerful, mystical bloodline, with the táltos concept woven into the show's supernatural and spiritual themes.

== See also ==
- Hungarian mythology
- Hungarian shamanism
- Hungarian neopaganism
