= Mythical number =

Calculated number of unknown origin

A mythical number is a number used and accepted as deriving from scientific investigation and/or careful selection, but whose origin is unknown and whose basis is unsubstantiated. An example is the number 48 billion, which has often been accepted as the number of dollars per year of identity theft. This number "has appeared in hundreds of news stories, including a New York Times piece" despite the fact that it has been shown repeatedly to be highly inaccurate.

The term was coined in 1971 by Max Singer, one of the founders of the Hudson Institute. Another name for the phenomenon is the zombie statistic, where an oft-quoted figure might be demonstrably false but "won't die".

The origins of such numbers are akin to those of urban legends and may include (among others):

- misinterpretation of examples
- extrapolation from apparently similar fields
- especially successful pranks
- comical results
- guess-estimates by public officials
- deliberate misinformation

== See also ==
- Confabulation
- Factoid
- For all intents and purposes
- Newspeak
- Noble lie
- Truthiness
- Verisimilitude

== Bibliography ==
- Singer, Max (Spring 1971). "The vitality of mythical numbers". Public Interest (23): 3–9.Online at edwardtufte.com.
- Reuter, Peter (1987). "The (continued) vitality of mythical numbers". Public Interest (75): 79–95.
- Cook, Philip J.; Jens Ludwig; David Hemenway (Summer 1997). "The gun debate's new mythical number: how many defensive uses per year?". Journal of Policy Analysis and Management. 16 (3, special issue: The New Public Management in New Zealand and beyond): 463–469. doi:10.1002/(SICI)1520-6688(199722)16:3<463::AID-PAM6>3.0.CO;2-F.
