= Bernhardsthal =

- Municipality
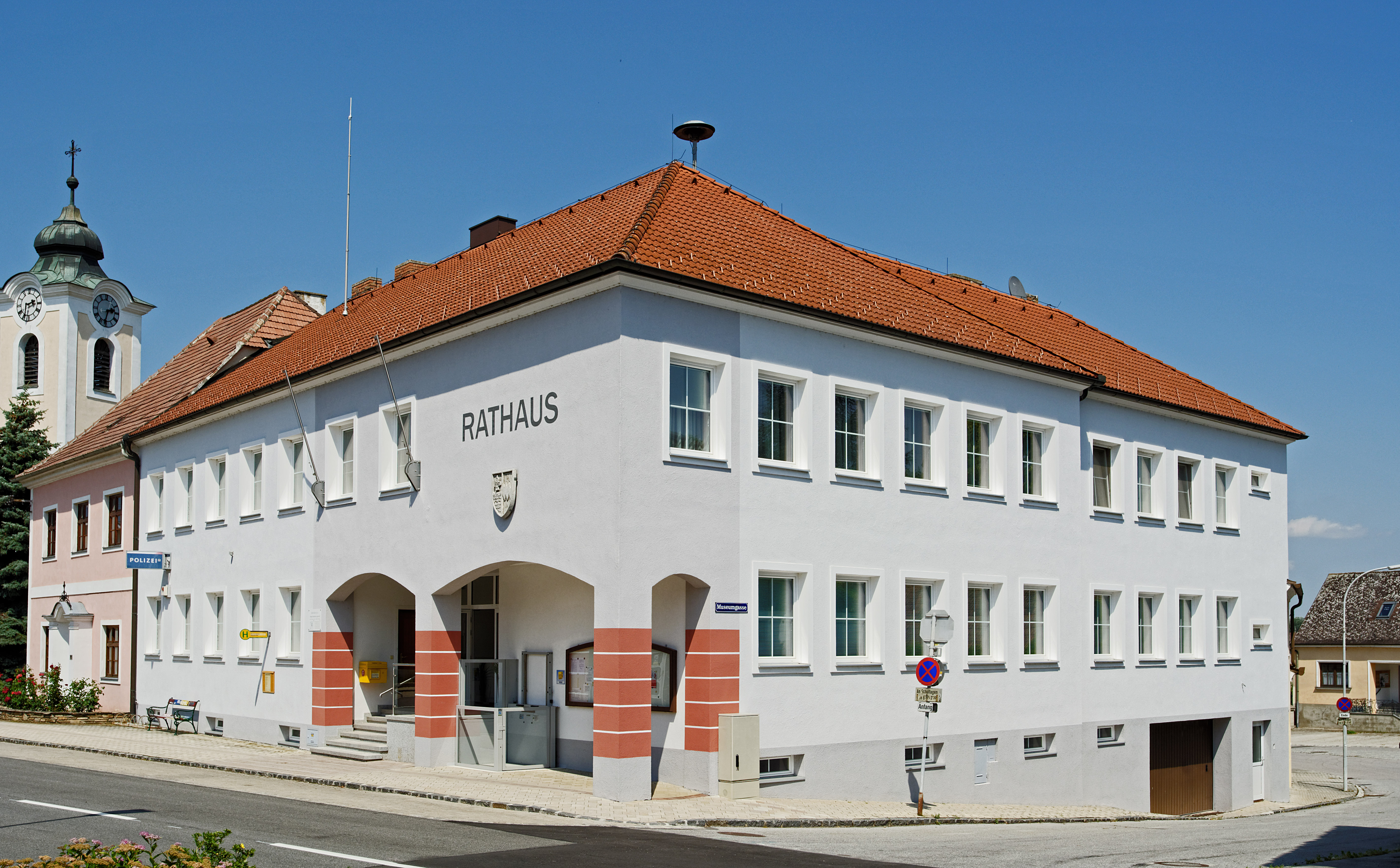
- Town hall

- Coat of arms

- Location within Austria
- Coordinates: 48°42′N 16°52′E
- Country: Austria
- State: Lower Austria
- District: Mistelbach

Government
  - Mayor: Doris Kellner (ÖVP)

Area
  - Total: 51.95 km^{2} (20.06 sq mi)
- Elevation: 166 m (545 ft)

Population (2018-01-01)
  - Total: 1,604
  - Density: 30.88/km^{2} (79.97/sq mi)
- Time zone: UTC+1 (CET)
  - Summer (DST): UTC+2 (CEST)
- Postal code: 2275
- Area code: 02557
- Website: www.bernhardsthal.gv.at

Bernhardsthal is a town in the district of Mistelbach in the Austrian state of Lower Austria.

The municipality consists the three villages (population):

- Bernhardsthal (819)
- Katzelsdorf (370)
- Reintal (410)

== Population ==
Historical population
Year	Pop.	±%
1971	2,570	—
1981	2,139	−16.8%
1991	1,852	−13.4%
2001	1,685	−9.0%

== Notable people ==
- Franz Migerka (1828-1915), Museologist

== Bodies of water ==
- Lake Bernhardsthal
