= Shamanistic remnants in Hungarian folklore =

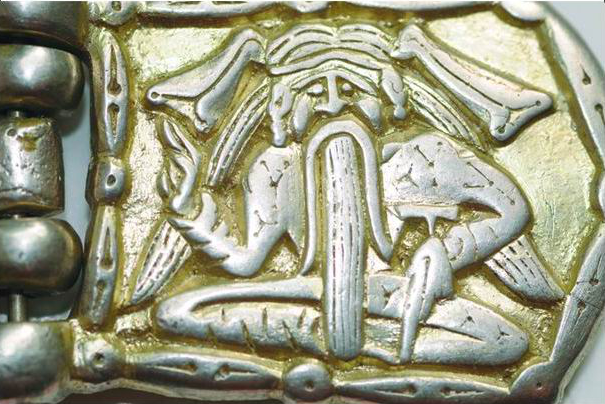
A fastener from the 9th century, unearthed in Kirovohrad Oblast, Ukraine; the finding belongs to the possibly Hungarian "Subotcy find horizon"

Hungarian shamanism is discovered through comparative methods in ethnology, designed to analyse and search ethnographic data of Hungarian folktales, songs, language, comparative cultures, and historical sources.

== Research ==
Studies reveal that some features of Hungarian folklore are remnants of shamanistic beliefs, or perhaps more specifically, Tengrist beliefs, from prior to the Hungarians’ settlement in the Carpathian Basin. Some beliefs could be an effect of Eastern influences thereafter, such as Cuman immigration.

These remnants are partly conserved as fragments by some features of customs and beliefs, for example

- refrains of certain folksongs accompanying some customs;
- certain motifs of folktales, e.g. sky-reaching tree, which was a specific belief among several central Eurasian peoples, having some resemblances to the world tree concept, but it was also related to the shaman's tree and had some other peculiarities as well.

== Characteristics ==
There were also people who filled similar roles to those performed by shamans among other peoples: fortune-telling, weather magic, finding lost objects. These people are related to shamanism (in contrast to the cunning folk of non-shamanistic cultures), because the former are recorded to go through similar experiences to those of many shamans: being born with physical anomalies such as a surplus amount of bones or teeth, illness, dismemberment by a mythological being and recovering with greater or increased capabilities, or struggle with other shamans or beings.

Related features can be recognized in several examples of shamanism in Siberia. As the Hungarian language belongs to the Uralic family, we can expect to find them among other peoples who speak Uralic languages. Some of them maintained shamanism until modern times; the isolated location of Nganasan people made it possible that shamanism was a living phenomenon among them even at the beginning of 20th century. The last notable Nganasan shaman's seances were recorded on film in the 1970s.

The original location of the Proto-Uralic peoples (and its extent) is debated. The combined results of several sciences suggest that this area was north of Central Ural Mountains and on lower and middle parts of the Ob River. This approach combined ecological, namely phytogeographical and paleobotanic (including palynological) data together with linguistic (phytonymic and comparative) considerations: the distribution of various tree species in Siberia and Eastern Europe (changing over time) was matched against the distribution of the respective tree-names in various Uralic languages (filtered with comparative methods, so that only names of Proto-Uralic relevance be taken into account).

== Artifacts ==
Some artifacts, see online available pictures and descriptions:

- Sky-reaching tree standing on a hill, with a celestial body top left, and cattle on both lower and upper levels. Aso, Diószegi Vilmos identified a shamanic ladder on the image. Decoration of a horn saltcellar, collected in Biharnagybajom village of Hajdú-Bihar county. The figure about the artifact (together with other related ones) is drawn by Szűcs Sándor ethnographer. See online.
- Combat of two táltos people (both in the guise of bulls). Decoration on corn saltcellar, collected in Sárrét. The artifact is drawn by ethnographer Szűcs Sándor. See online. Another image depicts táltos people fighting as black and white bulls, one of them helped by a man. Drawn by Dudás Juló, Galgamácsa. Not online.

== Soul dualism ==
Soul dualism can be observed in several cultures in many variations: people are believed to have more than one soul. Examples can be found in several north Eurasian cultures and in some Inuit groups as well as Hungarians. Some of the many examples distinguish two souls: a body soul for maintaining bodily functions, and a free soul which can leave the body (even during life), with great variations on this theme among cultures.

In some cultures, it may be related to shamanic concepts. In shamanistic beliefs of some Inuit groups, the shaman's "spirit journey", with his helping spirits, to remote places is explained with such soul concepts. It is the shaman's free soul that leaves his body. According to an explanation, this temporal absence of the shaman's free soul is tracked by a substitute: the shaman's body is guarded by one of his/her helping spirits during the spirit journey, also a legend contains this motif while describing a spirit journey undertaken by the shaman's free soul and his helping spirits.

As mentioned, it was also observed among Hungarians. The body soul, lélek was related to breathing (shown by etymology). The shadow soul called íz was related to the roaming soul of the dead. Its feared nature can be seen, as it features also in curse expressions: “Vigyen el az íz!” (= “the shadow soul take you!”). This curse is unknown for most people nowadays, and word "íz" (in this meaning) is also unknown, or felt as an archaism with forgotten meaning.

== See also ==
- Táltos
- Hungarian mythology
