= Religion in Hungary =

Religion in Hungary (2022 census)
1. Latin Catholicism (27.5%)
2. Greek Catholicism (1.70%)
3. Calvinism (9.80%)
4. Lutheranism (1.80%)
5. Other Christians (1.70%)
6. Not religious (16.1%)
7. Other religions (1.30%)
8. Not answered (40.1%)

Religion in Hungary is varied, with Christianity being the largest religion. In the national census of 2022, 42.5% of the population identified themselves as Christians, of whom 29.2% were adherents of Catholicism (27.5% following the Roman Rite, and 1.7% the Greek Rite), 9.8% of Calvinism, 1.8% of Lutheranism, 0.2% of Eastern Orthodox Christianity, and 1.5% of other Christian denominations. 1.3% of the population identified themselves as adherents of other religions; minorities practising Judaism, Islam, Buddhism, Hinduism, the Baháʼí Faith, Taoism, Tengrism, Hungarian Neopaganism and other Neopaganisms, and New Age, are present in the country. At the same time, 40.1% of the population did not answer, not identifying their beliefs or non-beliefs, while 16.1% identified themselves as not religious.

== History ==
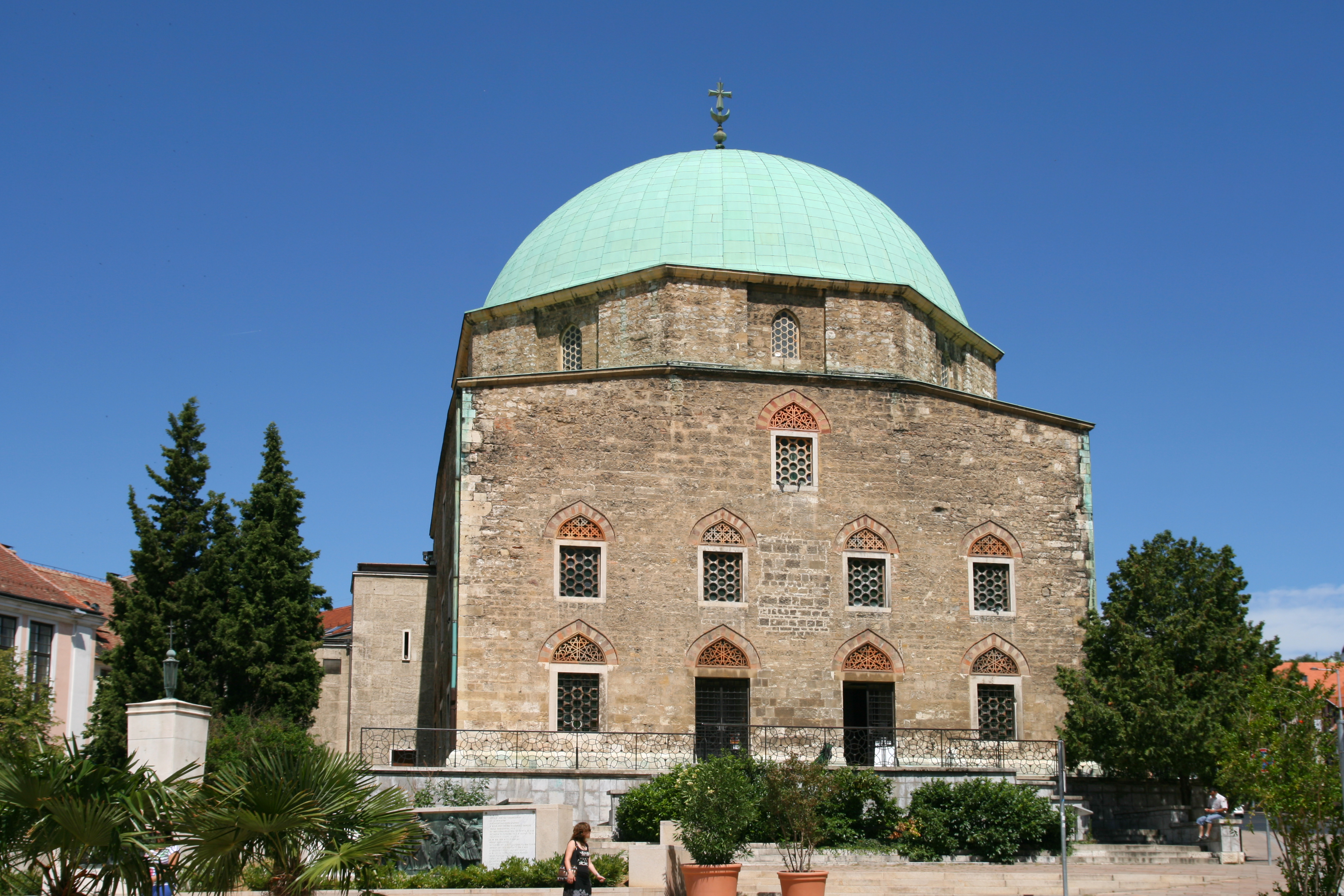
Downtown Candlemas Church of the Blessed Virgin Mary in Pécs, formerly the Mosque of Pasha Qasim

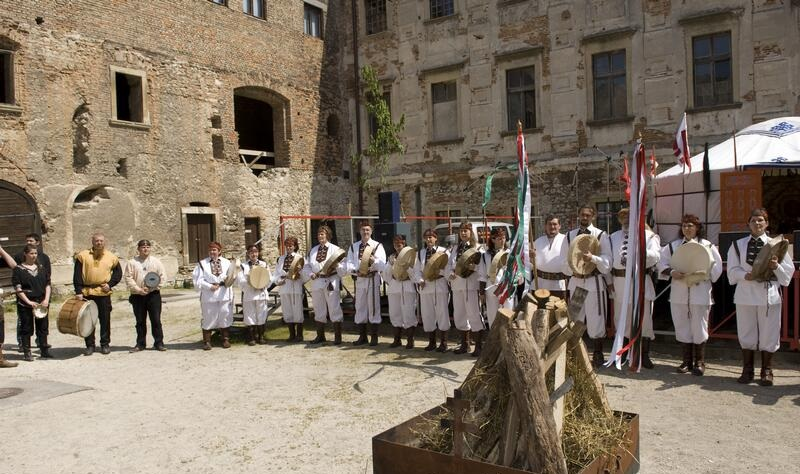
Religious ceremony held by táltoses of Hungarian Neopaganism

=== 1st–10th century ===
In antiquity, the lands of the Carpathian Basin covered by the contemporary state of Hungary were inhabited by sedentary tribes of Celts and Illyrians (the Pannonians) in the parts west of the river Danube — the region of Transdanubia — and by nomadic tribes of Scytho-Siberians (the Iazyges) in the parts east of the Danube — the Great Plain — with varying degrees of relations with each others. In the early years of the 1st century, the Celto-Illyrian western lands were incorporated into the region of Pannonia in the Roman Empire; the Roman military conquest of the region had already begun under Augustus, who in 12–9 BCE had pushed the Roman frontier to the riverbanks of the Danube, and by the year 20 CE the permanent military camp of Aquincum, located within the area which today is the city of Budapest, had been founded. The Celts and Illyrians were partially Romanised under the Roman Empire; this was especially true for their upper classes, while the population as a whole preserved their original cultures for a long time even under Romanisation. Religiously, the Roman authorities built temples of the official Roman religion of the state, to Jupiter, Juno and Minerva, but also Romano-Celtic temples which continued the cults of the pre-Roman Celtic religion. Mystery religions, focused on individual otherworldly salvation, originating from the southeastern provinces of the Roman Empire, also spread to Pannonia, including Greco-Roman-Iranian Mithraism, Greco-Roman-Egyptian Isis-Anubis-Serapis' mysteries, Greco-Roman-Semitic Judaism, and also Christianity from the 2nd century, and various places of worship of these faiths were built as well.

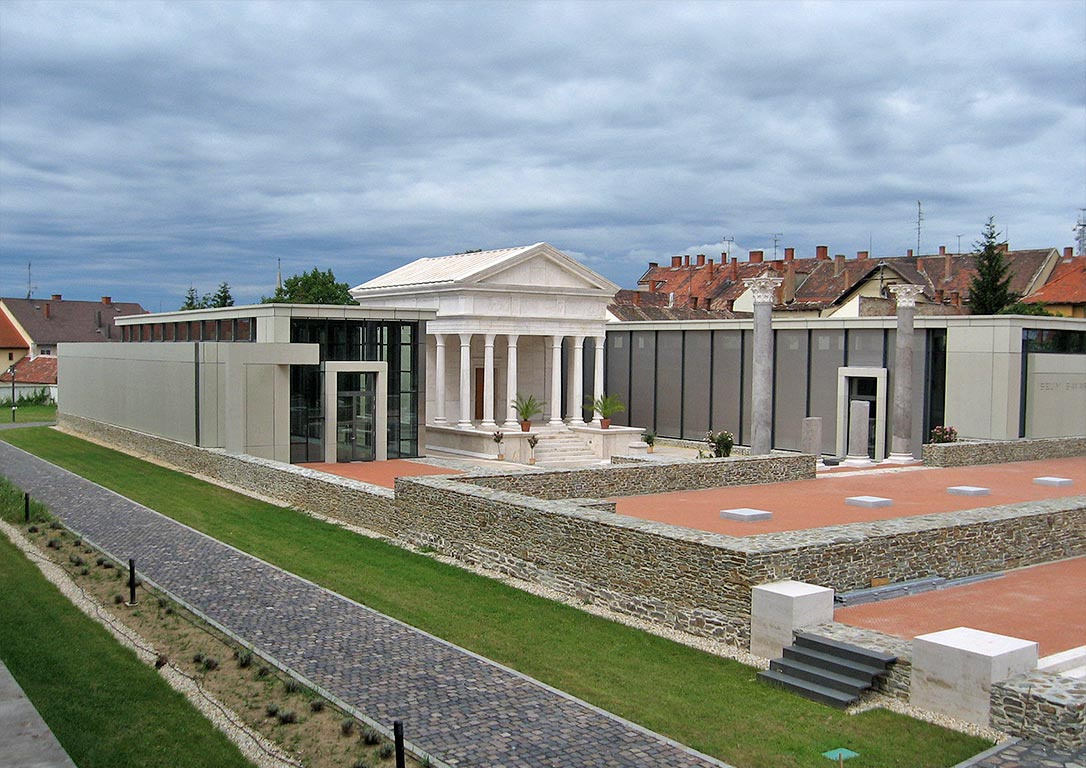
Temple of Isis in Szombathely. Rebuilt in 2011 on the site of the ruins of Roman Pannonian temple of the mysteries of Isis.

Roman Pannonia was periodically under attack by its eastern nomadic Scythian neighbours of the Great Plain, whom throughout the 2nd and 3rd century were joined by many Germanic nomads, and at the turn between the 4th and the 5th century by the Huns, a multiethnic confederation of nomadic tribes whose original core can probably be identified as the Xiongnu of the Chinese sources, who came from Inner Mongolia and the Gobi Desert and against whom the Chinese built the Great Wall, but by that time, and especially under their king Attila (c. 406–453), had absorbed many Germanic tribes, especially Goths. In 409, and then in 433 by general Flavius Aetius, the Romans yielded the lands of Pannonia to the Huns, who made them their central settlement; this marked the beginning of an ethnic transformation of the population of the region: as the Roman power waned, the local Celto-Romans, although their population shrank significantly, were not completely displaced by the newcomers, who culturally and linguistically absorbed them. Little is known about the religion of the Huns, apart that a winged griffin may have been their totemic animal-ancestor. Between the 6th and the 8th century, the regions of Pannonia and the Great Plain were dominated first by the Germanic Gepids and then by the Avars, a multiethnic alliance of nomadic tribes akin to the Huns, who brought other totemisms and the theme of the many-layered world tree which reaches the utmost sky, which together with earlier Hunnic beliefs would have continued in the beliefs of the later Hungarians; the regions were also settled by significant communities of Slavs. In 803, the Frankish emperor Charlemagne defeated the Avar rulers in Pannonia, and this region became part of the officially Christian polity of the Carolingian Empire of the Franks, as the March of Pannonia until 895, while the Great Plain fell under the sphere of influence of the First Bulgarian Empire. According to some historical accounts, some Avar governors converted to Christianity once they were defeated by the Franks, but there is no trace of Christian elements in the large Avar cemeteries of the epoch.

Foundation of the Hungarian state is connected to the Hungarian conquerors, who arrived from the Pontic-Caspian steppe as a confederation of seven tribes. The Hungarians arrived in the frame of a strong centralized steppe-empire under the leadership of Grand Prince Álmos and his son Árpád, they became founders of the Árpád dynasty, the Hungarian ruling dynasty and the Hungarian state. The religion thought to have been practiced by the majority of the Hungarian tribes consisted of animistic and shamanic elements according to scholars, and is hypothesised to have been similar to Siberian shamanism-Tengrism. Scholars have also compared it to Sumerian and Scythian religions. The conception of a supreme God, akin to the pan-Siberian Tengri (meaning "Heaven" or "God" in Turkic), has also been hypothesised. Some scholars, however, have disputed the identification of the Hungarian shaman-like figures, the táltoses, as shamans in the typical Siberian sense, and have found no clear evidence of shamanic rituals. Based on later prohibitions from Christian regulations, there is evidence that they practised sacrifices at holy groves and springs. Meanwhile, Islam was practiced by a sizeable minority of the settled Hungarian tribes. Muslims of this period described the majority religion as involving a belief in the “Lord of the Sky”, abstention from pork, the worship of natural forces and fire, and containing elements associated with astrotheology.

The evidence that Christianity was practised among the Hungarians before the 950s is weak. The question of the continuity of Christianity in the region since Roman times is unresolved; Christian places of worship that were built in the 3rd and 4th century in Transdanubia, the former Roman province of Pannonia, and under Carolingian rule in the 9th century, would have been rebuilt and reused by the Hungarians only in the 11th century. Some Christian communities of the pre-Hungarian populations of the regions, however, likely persisted under the newcomers, and Christian slaves, as well as trade with neighbouring Christianised Slavic and Germanic lands, probably made the Hungarians acquainted with Christianity. The first attested Hungarian converts to Christianity were the chieftains Bulcsú and Gyula, who adopted Eastern Christianity in the mid-10th century, followed by other local lords.

=== 11th–16th century ===
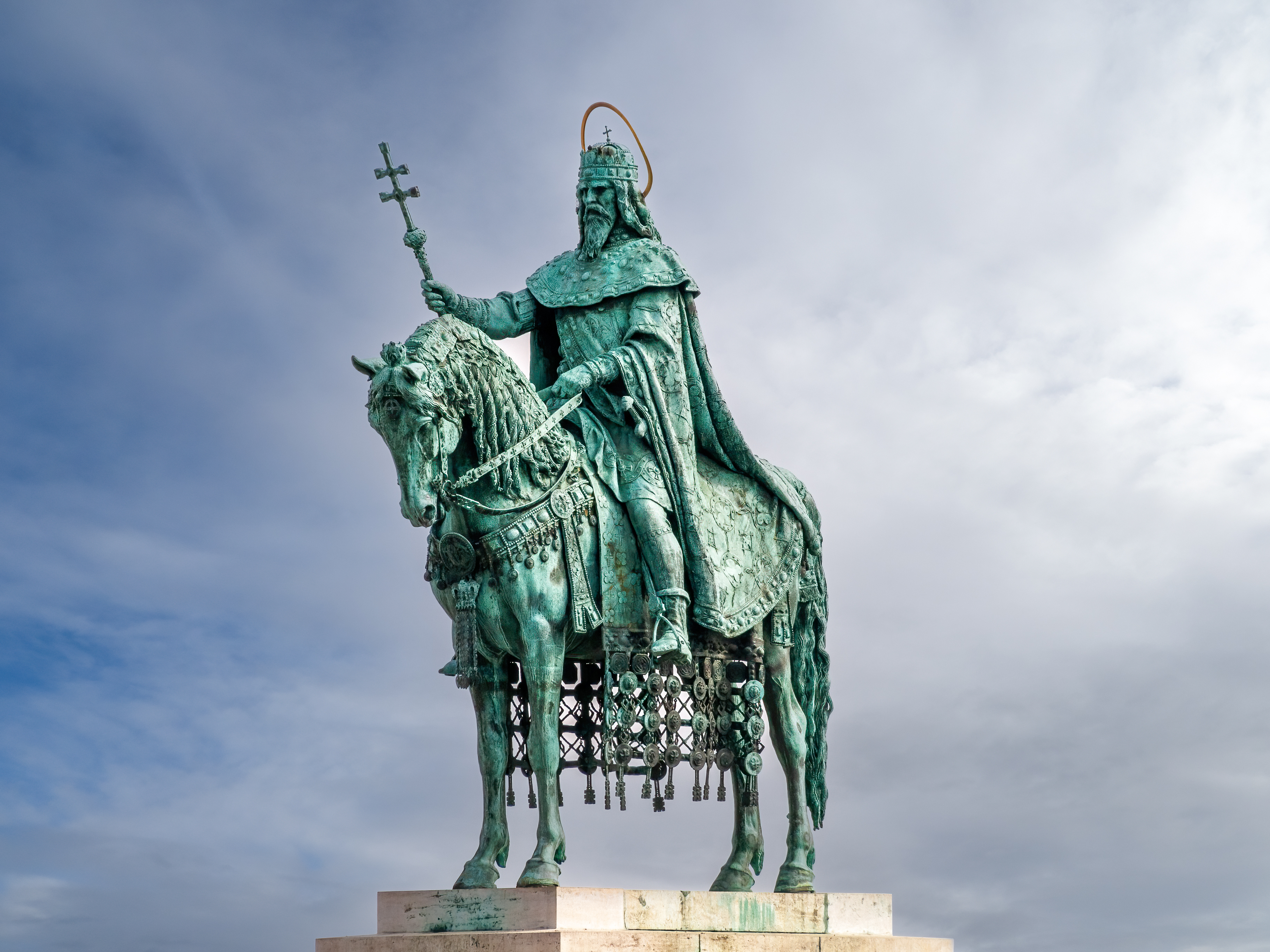
Equestrian statue of King Stephen I, in Budapest.

Medieval Hungarian chronicles incorporated Pagan myths, and transmitted them into the folklore; these include the myth of the brothers Hunor and Magor led by a divine stag to new lands, and the myth of the divine origins of the House of Árpád — the dynasty to which all the great princes of the Magyar tribes and later kings of Hungary from the 9th to the early 14th century belonged. According to this myth the Árpád's forefather Ügyek was born from the union of a mortal woman, Emese, with the Turul, a divine bird of the Hungarian indigenous religion. The presence of various Turkic tribal groups in medieval Hungary, such as the Pechenegs and Kipchaks, further contributed to the religious landscape of the region. The religious practices of these Turkic communities were diverse, with Islam and Tengrism being prominent amongst the Pechenegs.

Hungary emerged to statehood at the turn between the 1st and the 2nd millennium, when the federation of the Magyar tribes was reformed into the Kingdom of Hungary, and Western Christianity, specifically Catholicism, was chosen as the state religion. Although the Kingdom of Hungary was undoubtedly shapen by Western Christianity, minorities of Eastern Christianity, specifically Eastern Orthodox Christianity, continued to be present throughout the nation's history. Stephen I (c. 975–1038), the first sovereign who assumed the title of King of Hungary, adopted Catholicism and laid the foundations of the Catholic Church among the Hungarian people by establishing ten dioceses. Stephen started a program of Christianisation of his subjects, which at first met the resistance of Pagans and took place at least in part through coercion, through a system of legislative prohibitions of Paganism, Christianising regulations, and penalties for their violations. Within the 12th century, Paganism had been more or less eradicated and was portrayed in a dark light in historical records, although, in the late 13th century, ancient myths were reclaimed to give the ruling dynasty and the people glorious origins. Thenceforth, the principle of "patronate" of the state towards religions, or earlier royal care of spiritual matters, remained firm up throughout the 20th century.

A deep change in the country's religious composition took place during the 16th century, when Protestantism was quickly adopted by a majority of the Hungarians, especially in the forms at first of Lutheranism from Germany and shortly afterwards of Calvinism (Reformed Christianity) from Switzerland. The Protestant Reformation began to spread into Hungary from historical Upper Hungary (which included Northern Hungary but also areas which today are in Slovakia), originally as unclear eclectic theologies brought in the 1520s and 1530s by German itinerant preachers, which in the 1540s stabilised along the lines of the doctrine of Lutheranism, with minorities professing Anabaptism. Protestantism reached Hungary when the Catholic kingdom was in struggle with the Islamic Ottoman Empire and the central power was weak, since the Hungarian throne was contended between Ferdinand I of the Austrian House of Habsburg, the house which also held the throne of the Holy Roman Empire, and the Hungarian aristocrat John Zápolya (1487–1540). In 1526, after the Battle of Mohács, large portions of the southern and eastern Kingdom of Hungary, including Southern Transdanubia and the whole Great Plain, were incorporated into the Ottoman Empire. At the same time, the Hungarians of Transylvania further east, who had not fallen under the domains of either the Kingdom of Hungary or the Ottoman Empire, came under the rule of John Zápolya, who proclaimed himself the legitimate king, while the throne of the western main kingdom was claimed by Ferdinand I; while, at first, the latter tolerated Lutherans, Zápolya presented himself as a preserver of Catholicism. Transylvanian Hungarians were, however, the first among whom Calvinism and Unitarianism (a nontrinitarian doctrine) took root — first introduced among local Transylvanian Saxons — and, given that Lutheranism became increasingly associated with ethnic Germans throughout all the Hungarian lands, Calvinism became the most successful Protestant doctrine among ethnic Hungarians, first in Transylvania, abetted by the support of the son of Jon Zápolya, King John Sigismund Zápolya (1540–1571), himself a Unitarian convert, and soon afterwards also in Ottoman Hungary. Important Calvinist reformers were Márton Kálmáncsehi (1500–1550) and Péter Melius Juhász (1532–1572), the latter of whom made the Bible and other religious writings available in the Hungarian language and made Debrecen in the Great Plain the centre of Hungarian Calvinism, the "Hungarian Geneva" or the second "Calvinist Rome". Calvinism flourished in Ottoman Hungary, thanks to the tolerant Ottoman policies on religions, and was even supported by the Ottomans themselves against Catholicism because of its independent communal organisation and strict discipline, which were appreciated by the Ottoman administration. Calvinism also spread to the eastern parts of Upper Hungary, already penetrated by the Lutheran doctrine. Even in the western Kingdom of Hungary, where Catholicism had survived while elsewhere it had become residual, the nobility supported Lutheranism. The Hungarian Reformed Church became the symbol of national culture, since it popularised the Bible in the vernacular language and contributed to the education of the population through its school system.

=== 17th–19th century ===
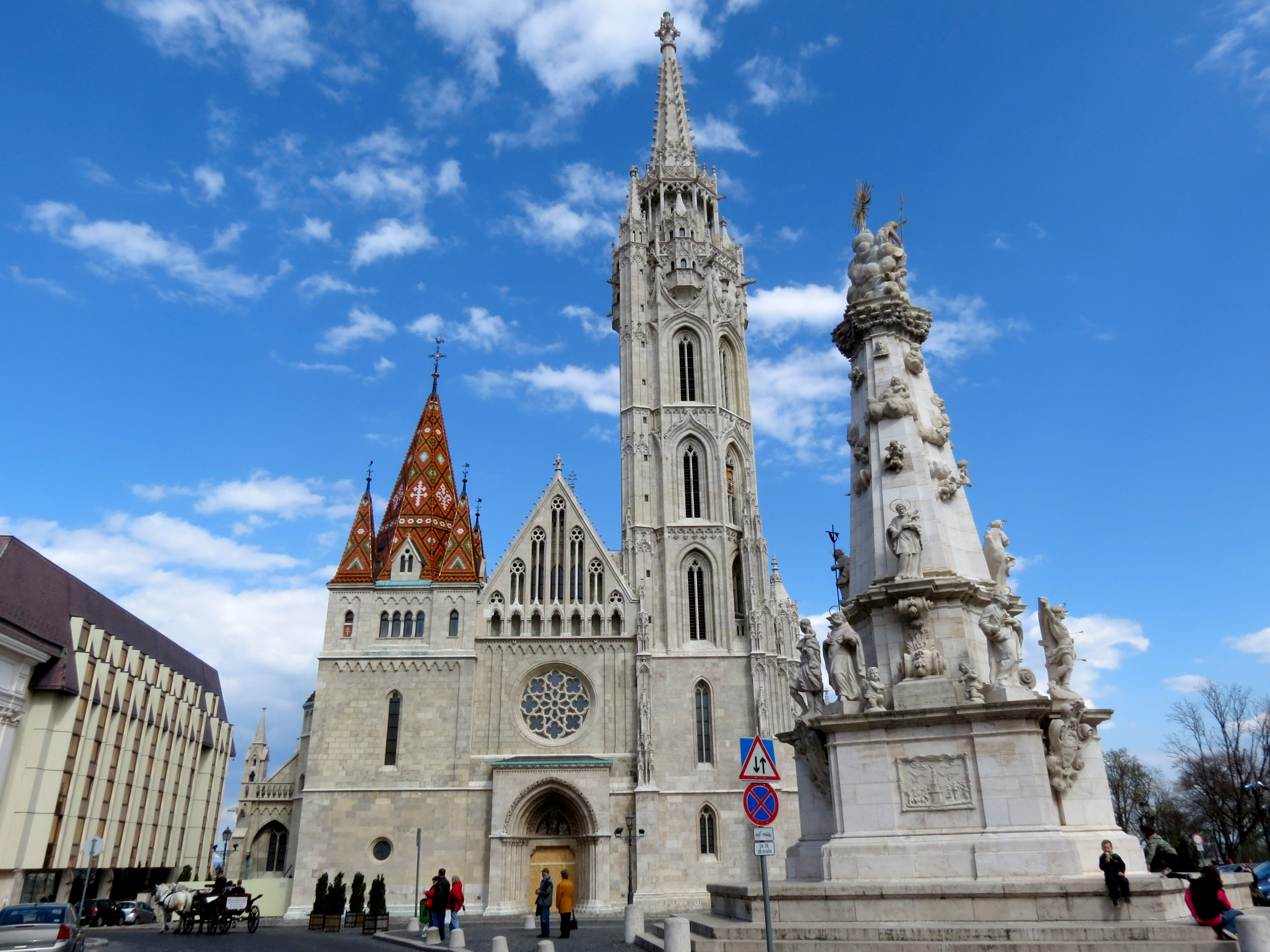
Matthias Church in Budapest.

While the Protestant Reformation was spreading rapidly throughout Europe, the House of Habsburg, which also held the throne of the Kingdom of Hungary, bolstered the program of Counter-Reformation devised by the Catholic Church to thwart the spread of Protestantism. In the Kingdom of Hungary, the Protestant nobility experienced some freedom in the 17th century, but its influence was soon curbed by the re-Catholicising efforts of the Habsburgs. In 1699, the Treaty of Karlowitz ended the Great Turkish War between the Holy League, of which the Holy Roman Empire of the Habsburgs was a constituent member, and the Ottoman Empire; the former won, and Ottoman Hungary was yolden to the Kingdom of Hungary, so that Hungary was reunified and the Counter-Reformation was extended to the whole country. The sway of the Habsburg state was also strong on the internal affairs of the Catholic Church, especially during the period of the enlightened absolutism of Josephinism in the 18th century — i.e. the imperial rule of Joseph II, 1765–1790 — when, for instance, contemplative religious orders were dissolved.

The Counter-Reformation had some success, but Hungary was never entirely converted back to Catholicism and maintained a strong pluralism of religious denominations, aided by a deeply characteristic tolerant approach of the Hungarians towards religious matters, although there were some periods of conflict between Catholics and Protestants, which nonetheless begot a "fruitful tension" which enriched national and local culture. At the end of the 18th century, the Calvinist and Lutheran religions regained complete freedom to be practised, although their legal status remained far from being equal to that of the Catholic Church. The legislation issued in the period of the 1848 Revolution, which took place against the Habsburg dynasty, declared the equality of all accepted religions in Hungary, which included all the historical Christian denominations but excluded Judaism. Jews became emancipated only in 1867, and by the end of the century their number had grown to represent over 5% of the total Hungarian population, and the liberal climate of the period led to their quick assimilation into Hungarian society. According to 1890 laws, religions in Hungary were distinguished between "incorporated" ones — namely Catholicism, Calvinism, Lutheranism, Orthodox Christianity, Unitarianism and Judaism, whose representatives held seats in the upper house of the Parliament — and "recognised" ones, which had fewer rights.

=== 20th century ===
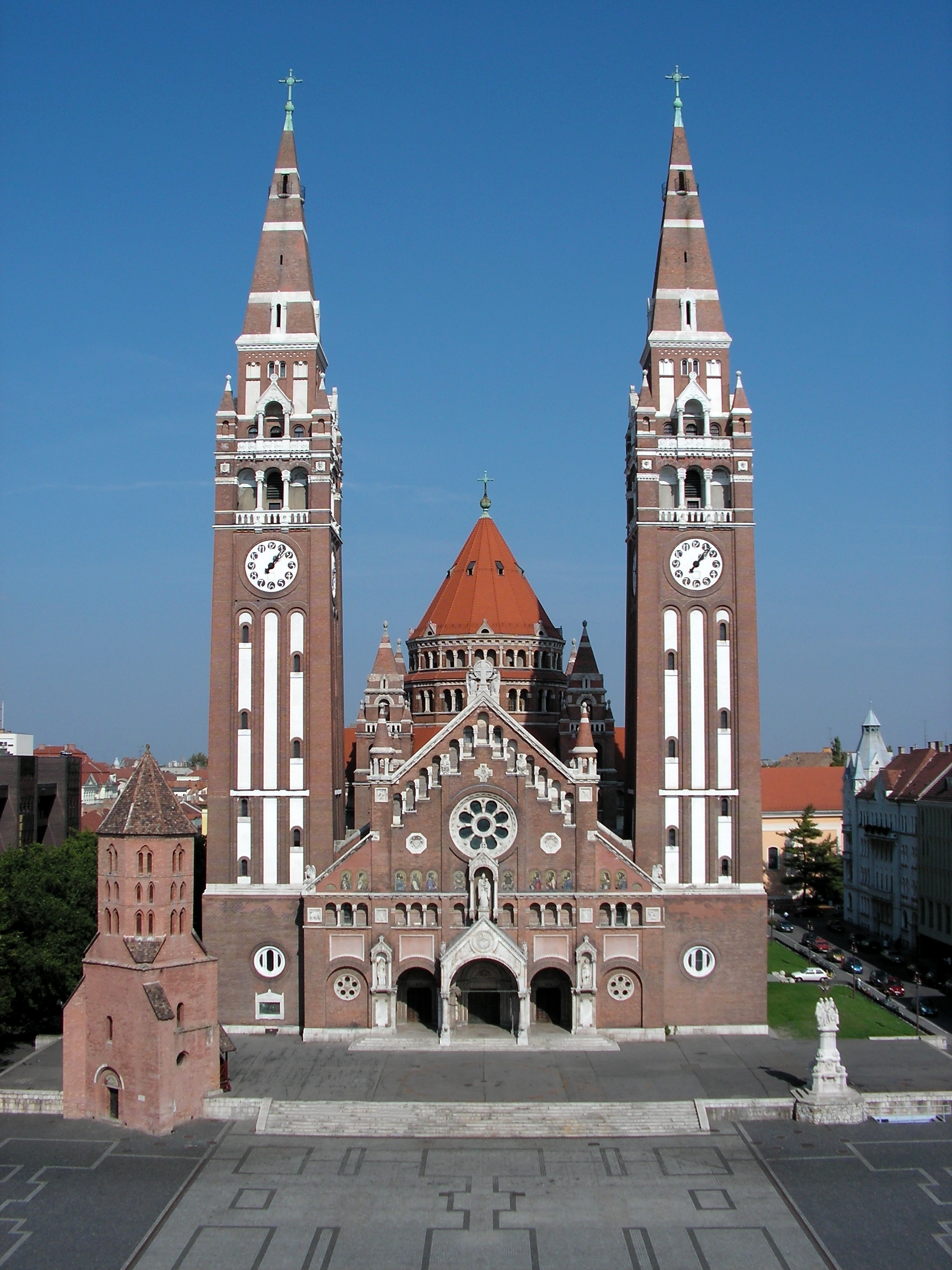
Votive Church and Cathedral of Our Lady of Hungary, in Szeged

After the end of World War I and the Treaty of Trianon in 1920, national conservative forces came to dominate the political and cultural life of the Kingdom of Hungary, and they rescinded some of the liberal legislation of the foregoing period. In March 1944, during World War II, Hungary was occupied by Nazi German forces, and in the following few months three-quarters of the Hungarian Jewry were deported to concentration camps and killed in the Holocaust.

During the 1946–1949 Hungarian Republic, the system of "incorporated" religions of 1890 was abolished, and all religions were treated as equal on the level of the "recognised" ones. With the Communist takeover in 1948, and the establishment of the Hungarian People's Republic in 1949, religious freedom was curtailed, education was nationalised and religious schools abolished, theological faculties were separated from national universities, religious orders were banned, the properties of churches were confiscated by the state, and numerous religious leaders were arrested, including the cardinal József Mindszenty, leader of the Hungarian Catholic Church, who in 1949 was tortured and sentenced to life imprisonment. Between 1948 and 1949, the leaders of all the major churches who had not been arrested, including the Catholic Bishops' Conference, signed agreements with the government, acknowledging the emerging Communist power. The State Office of Church Affairs exercised control over all churches, and while the collaboration between the state and minor denominations was easier, within the Catholic Church such collaboration brought to a rupture in the clergy, since the government claimed the right to regulate the nomination of bishops, and even minor priests, for itself.

In the 1960s, state pressure began to relax, and in 1964 the Holy See of the Catholic Church in Rome signed an agreement with the Hungarian government to define the procedure to be followed in the appointment of bishops, the oath of the clergy on the state's constitution, and the postgraduate education of the Hungarian clergy at the Pontifical Ecclesiastical Academy in Rome; the competence of the Holy See in matters of religion was also acknowledged in the document. These stipulations were a unique development in the Communist Block, and from that year onwards representatives of the Hungarian government and of the Holy See met twice a year, once in Budapest and once in the Vatican City. In the late 1980s, the state's control over religions were loosened significantly, historical denominations experienced more freedom and new denominations were recognised. The collapse of the Communist Block in the early 1990s opened a new era of religious freedom and church–state relations in Hungary, inaugurated in 1990 by the "Act of Freedom of Conscience and Religion and the Churches".

=== 21st century ===
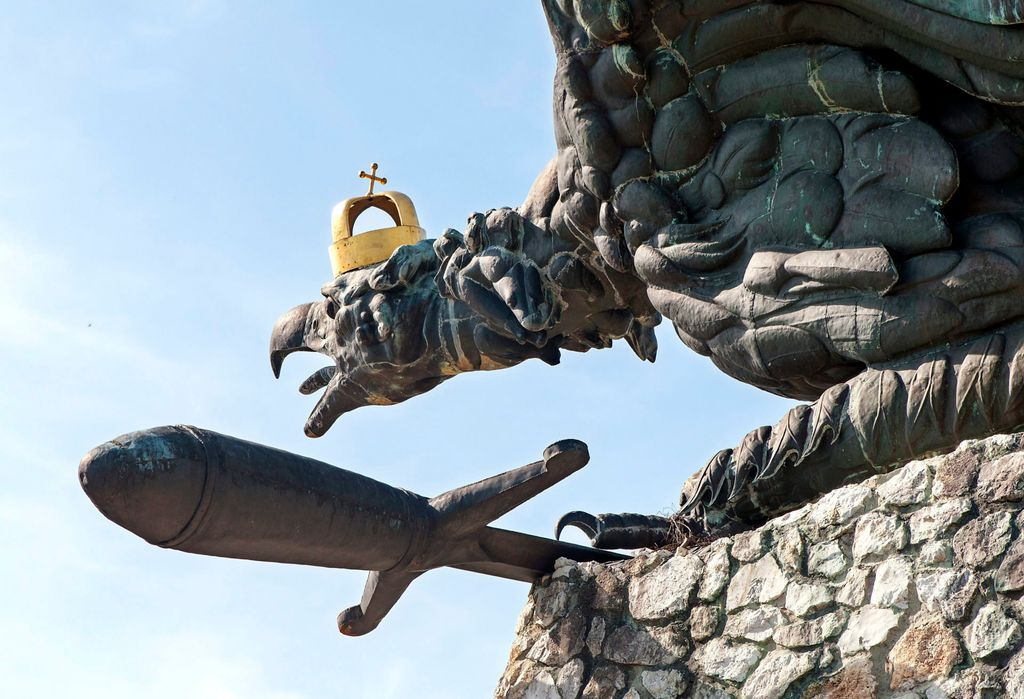
Statue of the Turul with the Holy Crown, on Kő Hill, in Bánhida, Tatabánya. The Turul is a divine bird in old Hungarian religion and shamanism, and has become one of the main symbols of contemporary Hungarian national identity. Several statues representing it have been built across Hungary, especially after 2010.

Since the 1990s and throughout the early 21st century, Hungary has become more religiously diverse; all the major world religions, and both domestic and international new religious movements, can be found in the country nowadays — apart from historical and new denominations of Christianity and Judaism, the country has seen the rise of movements and organisations of Buddhism, Hinduism, Islam, the Baháʼí Faith, Taoism, Ősmagyar vallás and other Neopaganisms, and New Age. The censuses of the 1990s and of the early 21st century have recorded an overall decline of Christianity among the Hungarians — affiliation to which shrank from 92.9% of the population in 1992, to 74.4% in 2001, 54.2% in 2011, and 42.5% in 2022 — accompanied by a rise of the unaffiliated people and people who declined to answer the census' question about religion. Adherents of new religions might be over-represented among the unanswering population, and contemporary studies on the general beliefs of the Hungarians have shown that among those who do not identify themselves as Christians, syncretism of elements from different religions and esotericism are indeed popular.

Contemporary Hungary is a secular state, where the Constitution guarantees freedom of religious belief and practice, and of irreligion, to all Hungarian citizens, as well as the neutrality of the state in matters of religion, safeguarded by a complex set of legal norms. The wording of the Hungarian Constitution on religious matters is similar to that of the Universal Declaration of Human Rights, although the Constitution also acknowledges the right of citizens not to espouse any religious convictions. The acknowledged neutrality of the state towards religions implies its separation from any particular church, that the state and churches function separately, but does not entail indifference towards religions and laicism; the state can have an active role in providing an institutional legal framework and funding for churches, in order to ensure the free exercise of religion. The Constitution also affirms that religious convictions can be expressed in ways that are not contrary to laws, that citizens must not be discriminated on the basis of their religious convictions, and recognises the right of parents to determine the religious or non-religious education of their children. Statutory law guarantees the equal rights of all religious organisations and for their cooperation with the state.

In 2011–2012, the Constitution was changed, and a new "Act CCVI on the Right of Freedom of Conscience and Religion, and on the Legal Status of Churches, Religious Denominations, and Religious Communities" was implemented. The new act, which replaced that of 1990, re-introduced a two-tiered classification of religious organisations, similar to that of 1890, distinguishing between officially registered "incorporated" churches, a higher status which also entails access to various privileges such as state funding, and "organisations conducting religious activities", with fewer rights and privileges. Many churches which had been granted official registration between 1990 and 2011 lost their status once the new Act CCVI was implemented. The new legislation was subject to an intense domestic and international criticism, and to lawsuits at the European Court of Human Rights.

The preamble of the 2011–2012 Constitution remembers that "Stephen built the Hungarian State on solid ground and made our country part of Christian Europe a thousand years ago", recognises "the role of Christianity in preserving the nation" and that "the various religious traditions of [the] country" should be honoured. In 2018, an amendment was made to guarantee "the protection of the constitutional identity and Christian culture of Hungary" as "an obligation of every organ of the State". According to Balázs Schanda, judge at the Constitutional Court of Hungary, the Constitution continues to be neutral with regards to religions, and does not commit the state to the Christian religion in particular; the amendment only enshrined the protection of Hungarian culture in its historical nature, as historically characterised by Christianity. It merely recognised an historical fact, that is the role played by Christianity in the history of the Hungarian nation, and does not claim that Christianity plays an exclusive role nowadays.

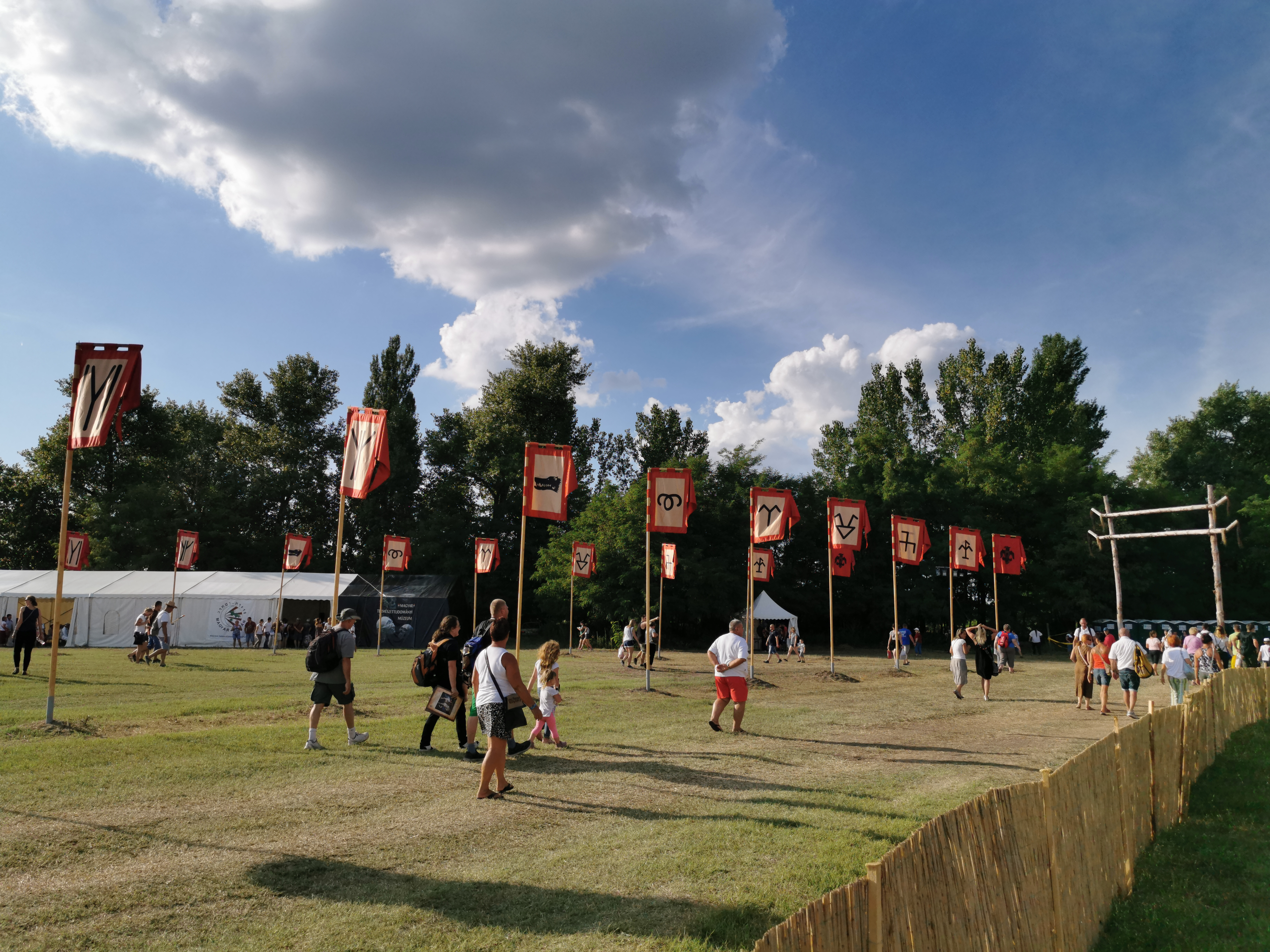
Gateway at the 2019 Kurultáj with flags representing various Hungarian runes and Pagan symbols.

According to the scholar István Povedák, elements from pre-Christian Paganism and shamanism, already preserved in the folk religiosity of Hungary as well as of Central and Eastern Europe, have been revived and reinvented in forms of Neopaganism, ethnic Ősmagyar vallás, which have become integrated in various dimensions of contemporary Hungarian culture, often in syncretism with Christian elements. Before World War II, in some rural areas certain persons were still considered táltoses, i.e. indigenous Hungarian shaman-magicians, by the local communities, and around the mid-1980s a neo-táltos movement began to emerge, with links to international neoshamanism. On 15 March 2012, the National Assembly of Hungary gave a Tuvan Tengrist shaman, Ojun Adigzi See-Oglu, the permission to perform a veneration ritual and cleansing ceremony on the Holy Crown of the Hungarian kings, an object which holds both Pagan and Christian meanings, at the Hungarian Parliament Building; Ojun was assisted by Éva Kanalas, a táltos, and folk singer, who sang Csángó folk religious songs during the ritual.

The scholars Zoltán Ádám and András Bozóki identify a Pagan-Christian mixed character in the 2011–2012 Constitution, as a reflection of the eclectic reference to both Christianity and ethnic Paganism which has been a feature of the political discourse of the right-wing Fidesz party and its leader Viktor Orbán, the governing forces in the 2010s. Daniella Gáti quotes Magdalena Marsovszky saying that the renewed Constitution, despite the references to Christian culture, would be "ultimately not Christian as much as folk and Pagan". According to Ádám Kolozsi, said syncretic, "heterogeneous mixture of Christian and Pagan elements", is part of a "wider spiritual discourse of contemporary Hungarian nationalism". Such an attitude would reconcile two conflicting cultural aspects in the character of the Hungarian nation: the "Western" universal one represented by Christianity, and the "Eastern" tribal one represented by ethnic Paganism, between which the identity of the Hungarians has always swungen. According to László Kürti, such syncretism, present among the people and promoted by the governmental elite, would be coalescing into a new civil Hungarian religion with neoshamanism at its core. Another strong political party of the 21st century, Jobbik, has on the other hand been seen as representing the "essentially Pagan, anti-Christian" fringe of the right-wing. Viola Teisenhoffer noted that the Kurultáj, a major festival with a political and anthropological character holden yearly since the second half of the 2000s in Bugac, in the Southern Great Plain, is essentially connected with the Pagan revival, with many contemporary Pagan leaders and their followers taking part in the event.

== Religions ==
=== Christianity ===
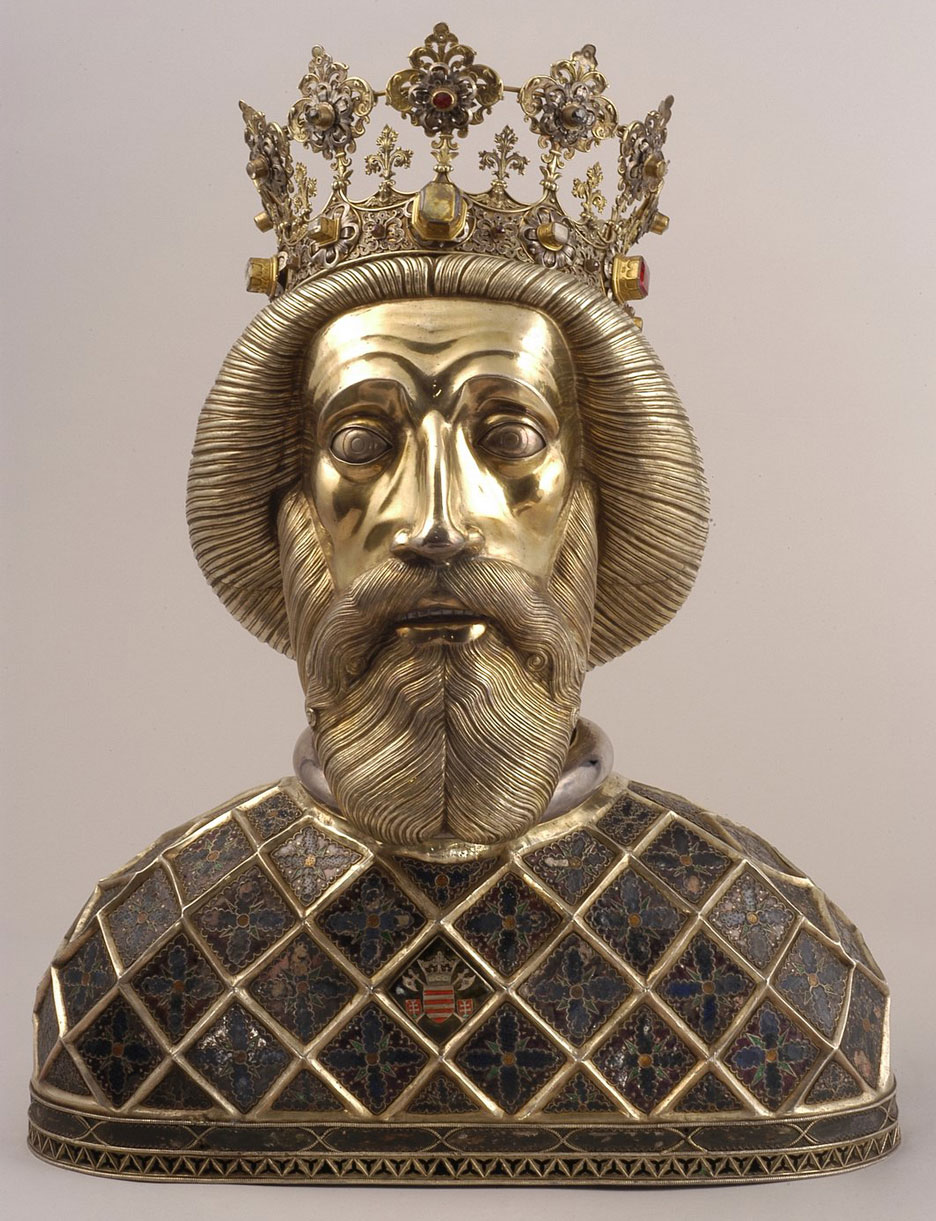
King Ladislaus I was an important figure in the country's Christianity during the Middle Ages.

The majority of Hungarians became Christian in the 11th century. Hungary's first king, Saint Stephen I, took up Western Christianity, although his mother Sarolt was baptized into Eastern Christianity. Hungary remained predominantly Catholic until the 16th century, when the Reformation took place and, as a result, first Lutheranism and then soon afterwards Calvinism became the religion of almost the entire population. Protestants composed some 85–90% of the entire population, more than a half of the Hungarian population being part of the Calvinist confessing Reformed Church and a quarter of Lutheran confessing Evangelical Church.

In the second half of the 16th century, however, the Catholic Habsburg Kings and Jesuits led a successful campaign of Counter-Reformation among the Hungarians. The Jesuits founded educational institutions, including Péter Pázmány Catholic University, the oldest university that still exists in Hungary, and also organized missions in order to promote popular piety.

Using both political and apologetic efforts, most of the high nobility composing the Diet was already predominantly Catholic by the 1640s, a process consolidated as the new reconquered estates were granted to the converted aristocracy, who supported in Counter-Reformation. Despite this, the lower nobility, the town burghers and the common people still retained a largely Protestant – especially Calvinist – identity, opposing the Catholic German-likeness of the Habsburg courtly politics. Allied with the Constitutional Rights enforced by the nobility and the military pressure of the Protestant Principality of Transylvania on the eastern border, the Catholic Counter-Reformation achieved partial results compared to the other Habsburg possessions, such as Bohemia and Austria, where Catholicism was restored to the status of the sole religion of the realm.

Some of the eastern parts of the country, especially around Debrecen (nicknamed "the Calvinist Rome"), still have significant Protestant communities. The Reformed Church in Hungary is the second-largest church in Hungary with 1,153,442 adherents as of 2011. The church has 1,249 congregations, 27 presbyteries, and 1,550 ministers. The Reformed Church supports 129 educational institutions and has 4 theological seminaries, located in Debrecen, Sárospatak, Pápa, and Budapest.

Lutheranism is the third main historical Christian denomination in Hungary. It was introduced by Saxon settlers in the early 16th century, but after its brief efflorescence, the introduction of the Reformed Church and the Counter-Reformation made it almost non-existent amongst Hungarians up to the late 17th century. Later it was re-introduced through inward migration by Saxons and Slovaks. Today, the Evangelical-Lutheran Church in Hungary is a small minority in Hungary. Despite its relatively small number of adherents, it had a strong power and influence in internal politics since Hungary's independence from the strongly Catholic Habsburg Empire.

The proportion of Protestants in Hungary decreased from around 27% in the early 20th century to about 16% in the early 21st century. Eastern Orthodoxy in Hungary has been the religion mainly of certain national minorities in the country, notably Romanians, Rusyns, Ukrainians, and Serbs.

Hungary has also been the home of a sizable Armenian Catholic community. They worship according to the Armenian Rite, but they have united with the Catholic Church under the primacy of the Pope. Some of the Armenians in Hungary are adherents of the Armenian Apostolic Church.

The Church of Jesus Christ of Latter-day Saints was legally recognized in Hungary in June 1988 and its first meetinghouse in the country was dedicated in October of the following year by President Thomas S. Monson. In June 1990, the Hungary Budapest Mission was created, followed by the first stake in June 2006. The mission, its districts, and the Budapest Hungary Stake together contain twenty-two wards and branches serving approximately 5000 members.

=== Islam ===
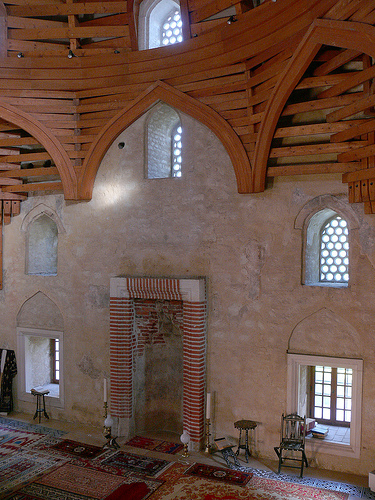
Interior of the Malkocs Bej Mosque in Siklós.

Islam was practiced by a sizeable minority of the conquering Hungarians, who arrived in the territory of present-day Hungary at the end of the 9th century. The Muslim population in Hungary was joined by additional Muslim settlers of diverse ethnic origins between the 10th and 13th centuries. Muslims in early Hungary were known as Böszörmény, Khalyzians, Saracen and Ishmaelites. Reportedly, around 30 Muslim villages existed in Hungary around the late 12th/early 13th century. The biggest Muslim settlement was in the central part of the Hungarian Kingdom, near the town of present-day Orosháza. This settlement, entirely populated by Muslims, was likely one of the largest settlements of the early Kingdom. By the late 13th century, the Muslim presence in Hungary had significantly diminished, primarily as a result of oppressive policies implemented by the Hungarian monarchy, largely driven by pressure from Christian groups.

Hungarians were reintroduced to Islam via the Ottoman Empire, particularly after the country came under Ottoman rule in 1541. Moreover, the country has long absorbed movements of ethnic Bosniak, Albanian and Turkish Muslims.

According to the 2011 census, there were 5,579 Muslims in Hungary, less than 0.1% of the total population. Of these, 4,097 declared themselves as Hungarian and 2,369 as Arab by ethnicity.

=== Judaism ===
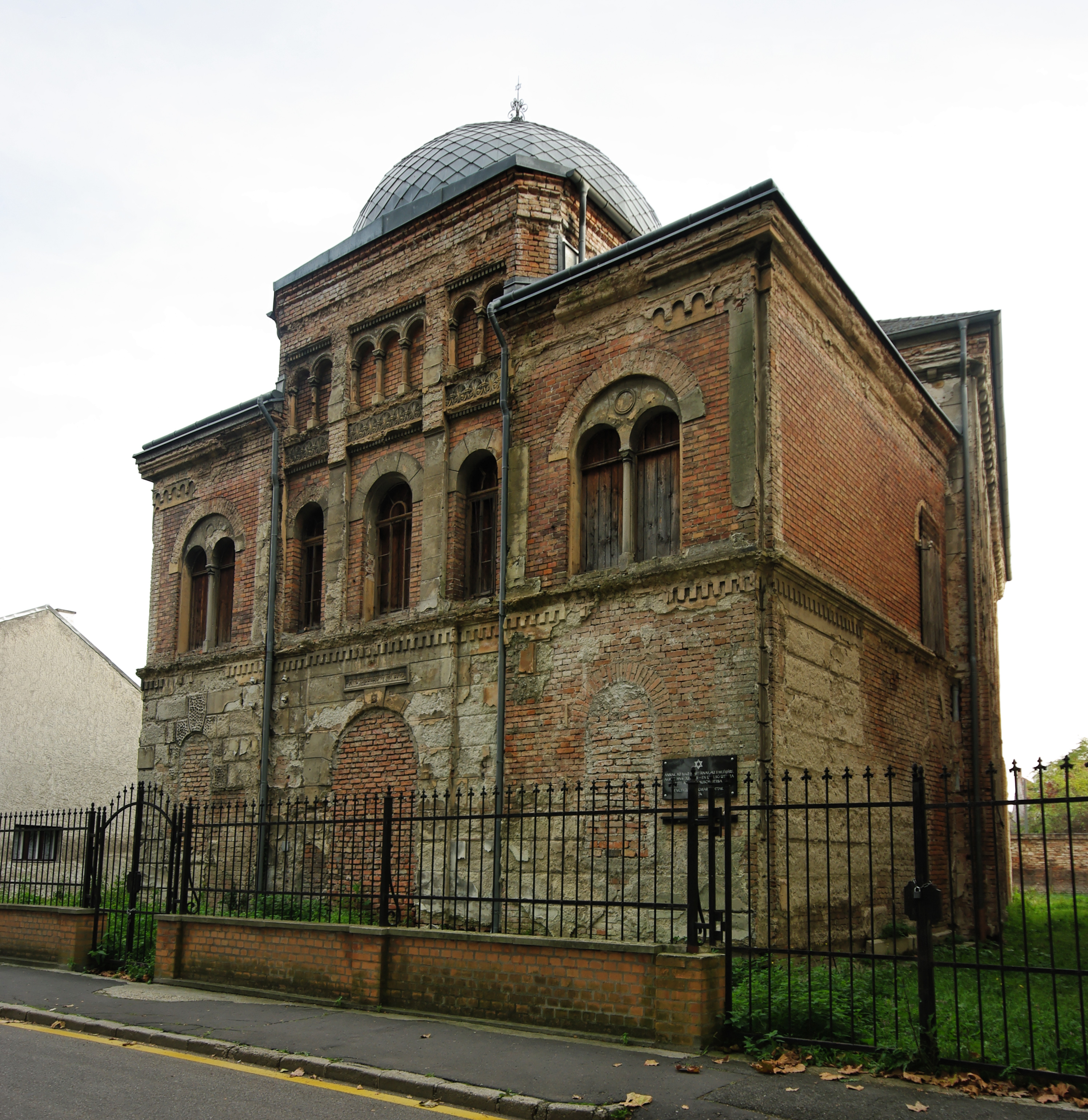
The former synagogue of the Hungarian city of Sopron.

Historically, Hungary was home to a significant Jewish community. In the 19th century, the pressures of Jewish emancipation, acculturation and secularization led growing tension between modernists and traditionalists. These culminated in 1871, when a communal schism between the Neologs, roughly equivalent to American Conservative Judaism, and Orthodox, divided Hungarian Jews. The census of January 1941 found that 4.3% of the population, or around 400,000 people, were considered of the Jewish religion (not including Christians of Jewish descent or converts to Christianity, who were registered as Jews by race under the new Anti-Jewish laws). In 2011, only 10,965 Jews (0.1% of the population) remained. Some Hungarian Jews were able to escape the Holocaust during World War II, but most (perhaps 550,000) either were deported to concentration camps, from which the majority did not return, or were murdered by the Arrow Cross fascists. Most Jewish people who remain in Hungary live in the centre of Budapest, especially in district VII. The largest synagogue in Europe, the Dohány Street Synagogue, is located in Budapest.

=== Buddhism ===
In recent decades Buddhism has spread to Hungary, primarily in its Vajrayana forms through the activity of Tibetan missionary monks. Since in Hungary religions are encouraged to institutionalise into church (egyház) bodies in order to be recognised by the government, various institutions have formed, including the Hungarian Buddhist Church (Magyarországi Buddhista Egyházközösség), the Gate of Dharma Buddhist Church (A Tan Kapuja Buddhista Egyház), and others, mostly Vajrayana. A Shaolin temple, the Hungarian Shaolin Temple, was founded in Budapest in 1994.

"Navayana" Buddhism or Ambedkarite Buddhism, a recent Buddhist denomination emerged among the Dalits of India, a form of Buddhism socially and politically engaged for the betterment of the conditions of marginalised peoples, has been spread also to the Romani ethnic minority of Hungary.

=== Paganism ===
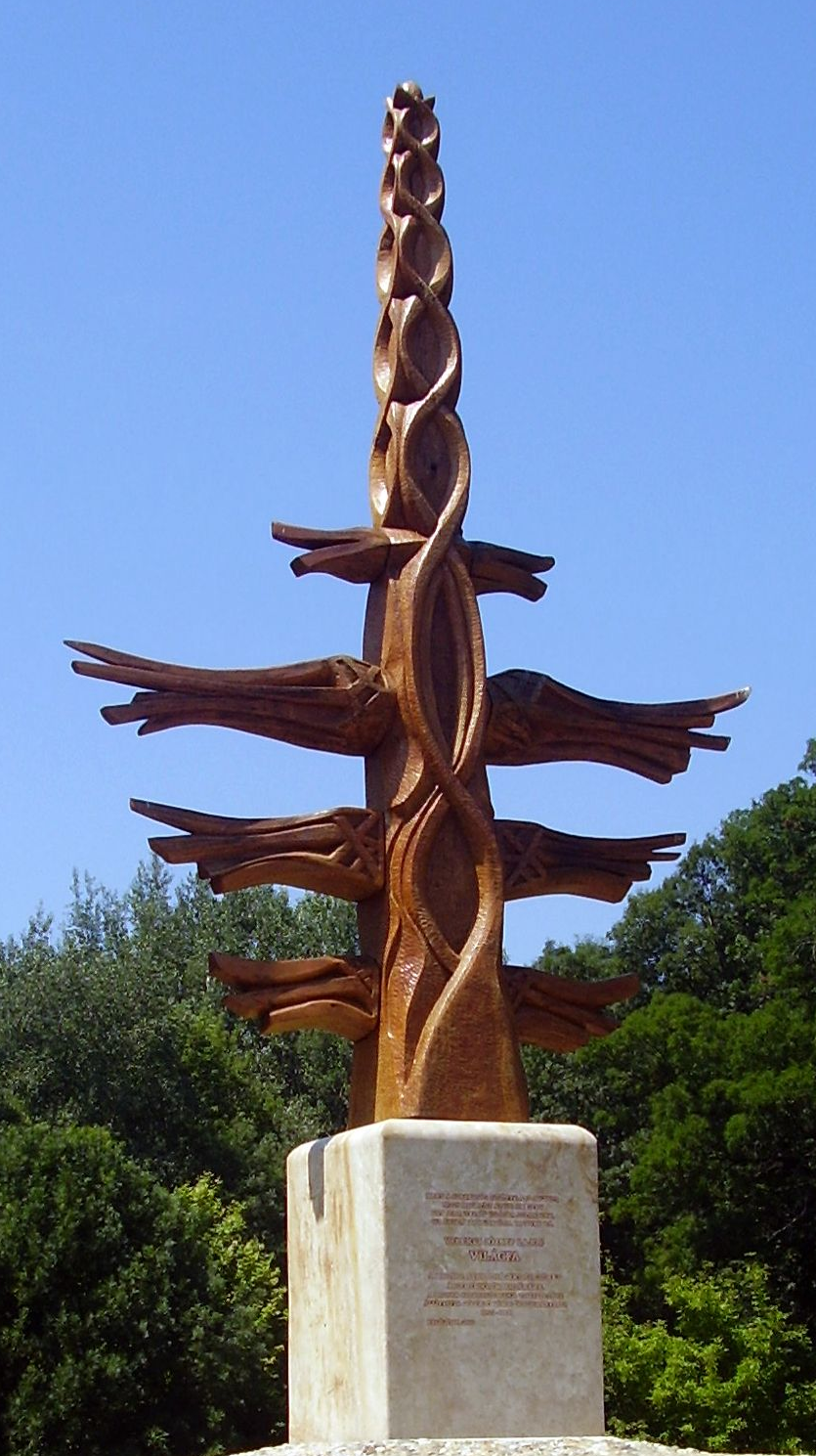
A világfa (world tree) erected in Gödöllő, Pest, Budapest metropolis.

Hungary has seen the rise of a varied movement of Neopagan religions (Hungarian: Újpogányság), the major ones being Ősmagyar vallás, meaning "Old Hungarian Religion" — defined as "Hungarian Native Faith" by scholars as it comprises those movements which are or claim to be based on the indigenous spirituality of the Hungarian ethnicity — and non-native religions including Egyptian Kemetism, Celtic Druidry, Wicca, and Mithraism.

Ősmagyar vallás is itself a composite and heterogeneous movement comprising diverse currents and organisations, which often both intertwine and conflict with each other; the scholar Ádám Kolozsi identified three of them: a Sumerian Zuism-oriented current, whose main ideologist has been the Assyriologist Ferenc Badinyi-Jós; a current of Scythian-Hunnic Tengrism-oriented national esotericism revolving around the Holy Crown of Hungary and an eschatological interpretation of Hungarian history — opened by the first shaman-king Attila, passing through the conflict between Cupan (Pagan) and Stephen (Christian), and closed by the future shaman-king Matthias — whose main ideologists have been Gábor Pap and Jajos Szántai and which syncretises the Christian heritage in its spiritual project; and a Uralic-Siberian Tengrism-oriented current, sometimes called Böőn, whose main ideologist has been Imre Maté.

The heterogeneity of Ősmagyar vallás is due to the fact that little is known about the pre-Christian Hungarian religion, apart that it was led by shaman-like magicians, called táltoses, and it has been hypothesised that it was akin to Siberian shamanism-Tengrism, and in earlier studies to Sumerian and Scythian religions. Apart from taltosism (táltosság), which is a common denominator of the various streams of Ősmagyar vallás, supported by the experiences and the work of various táltoses, strengthened since the 1980s by studies on the subject by Mihály Hoppál, who also invited Michael Harner and introduced core shamanism to Hungary, other sources that have contributed to the development of the movement have been the legacy of Hungarian Turanism, which arose between the two 20th-century World Wars and ascribed the ancient Sumerians, Scythians, and Huns, seen as ancestors of the Hungarians, to the same "Turanian macro-ethnicity", i.e. Uralo-Altaic, Uralic or Finno-Ugric-speaking peoples, and the spread of various forms of esotericism and New Age in the last decades of the Communist Block and in the 1990s. According to the scholars István Povedák and László A. Hubbes, the Sumerian current has been the dominant one, and has inspired a strong wave of religiousness, in which, for instance, Hungarian runes and symbols are interpreted as deriving from Sumerian cuneiform, the Turul of Hungarian mythology is interpreted as the same as the Sumerian Anzû, and the Hungarian term Isten ("God") is equated with the Akkadian Isten ("One"), the Siberian Tengri with the Sumerian Dingir–An (Akkadian Ilu).

Among Ősmagyar vallás organisations, the Hungarian Religious Fellowship (Magyar Vallás Közössége) and the Old Hungarian Church (Ősmagyar Egyház) belong to the Sumerian Zuist current; the Church of Esoteric Teachings – Church of the Holy Crown (Ezoterikus Tanok Egyháza – Szent Korona Egyház) and the Church of the Hun Universe – Holy Mother Church of the Huns (Hun Univerzum Egyháza – Hunok Anyaszentegyháza) belong to the Scythian-Hunnic Tengrist national esoteric current of the Holy Crown; the Traditional Church of the Legal Grounds of the Order of Árpád (Árpád Rendjének Jogalapja Tradicionális Egyház) belongs to a Hunnic Tengrist current which, however, fully rejects Christianity; while the Old Hungarian Taltos Church (Ősmagyar Táltos Egyház) and the Yotengrit Church of the Ancestral Spirit of the Endless Sea (Yotengrit Tengervégtelen Ős-szellem Egyháza) belong to the Uralic-Siberian Tengrist current and emerged directly from the grassroots táltos movement. The Tengri Fellowship (Tengri Közösség) is another Tengrist organisation in Hungary. Some of these churches cultivate connections with the Traditionalist School and the Nouvelle Droite of Alain de Benoist, which promotes a Europe-wide return to indigenous Paganism.

Among non-native Neopaganisms, the Ankh Church of Eternal Life (Ankh Örök Élet Egyháza) and the Sun Religion (Napvallás) are Kemetic organisations in the country, while the Sodalitas Mithraica Confessing Church (Sodalitas Mithraica Hitvalló Egyház) is an organisation of Mithraism. Wicca, a religion of English origin, is represented in Hungary by the Church of Celtic-Wiccan Tradition Keepers (Kelta-Wicca Hagyományőrzők Egyháza); Zsuzsanna Budapest, a Hungarian who emigrated to the United States, is the founder of the Wiccan denomination known as Dianic Wicca, popular in North America. The Association of Hungarian Witches (Magyar Boszorkányszövetség) is an organisation of Hungarian contemporary witchcraft.

== Demographics ==
=== Census statistics, 1920–2022 ===
Religious affiliations in Hungary, census 1920–2022
Religion	1920		1930		1941		1949		1992		1998		2001		2011		2022	
Religion	Number	%	Number	%	Number	%	Number	%	Number	%	Number	%	Number	%	Number	%	Number	%
Christianity	7,503,050	94.0	8,238,104	94.8	8,909,799	95.6	9,049,973	98.3	9,632,801	92.9	8,151,998	79.4	7,583,670	74.4	5,384,200	54.2	4,086,250	42.5
—Catholicism	5,278,119	66.1	5,832,238	67.2	6,353,054	68.2	6,488,755	70.5	7,030,182	67.8	5,934,326	57.8	5,558,456	54.5	3,870,565	38.9	2,808,990	29.2
——Latin Church	5,102,466	63.9	5,631,146	64.8	6,119,218	65.7	6,240,399	67.8	7,030,182	67.8	5,934,326	57.8	5,289,521	51.9	3,691,389	37.1	2,643,855	27.5
——Greek Catholic Church	175,653	2.2	201,092	2.3	233,836	2.5	248,356	2.7	–	–	–	–	268,935	2.6	179,176	1.8	165,135	1.7
—Calvinism	1,670,990	20.9	1,813,144	20.9	1,934,853	20.8	2,014,718	21.9	2,167,121	20.9	1,817,259	17.7	1,622,796	15.9	1,153,454	11.6	943,982	9.8
—Lutheranism	496,799	6.2	533,846	6.2	557,193	6.0	482,157	5.2	435,498	4.2	400,413	3.9	304,705	3.0	215,093	2.2	176,503	1.8
—Faith Church	–	–	–	–	–	–	–	–	–	–	–	–	3,708	0.04	18,220	0.2	22,647	0.2
—Jehovah's Witnesses	–	–	–	–	–	–	–	–	–	–	–	–	21,688	0.2	31,727	0.3	22,249	0.2
—Baptist Christianity	–	–	9,399	0.1	17,917	0.2	18,879	0.2	–	–	–	–	17,705	0.2	18,211	0.2	17,662	0.2
—Eastern Orthodox Church	50,917	0.6	39,839	0.5	38,317	0.4	36,015	0.4	–	–	–	–	14,520	0.1	13,710	0.1	15,578	0.2
—Pentecostalism	–	–	–	–	–	–	–	–	–	–	–	–	8,428	0.1	9,326	0.1	8,947	0.1
—Unitarianism	6,225	0.1	6,266	0.1	8,465	0.1	9,449	0.1	–	–	–	–	6,541	0.1	6,820	0.1	6,552	0.1
—Adventism	–	–	410	0.005	–	–	–	–	–	–	–	–	5,840	0.1	6,213	0.1	5,011	0.1
—Methodism	–	–	67	0.001	–	–	–	–	–	–	–	–	1,484	0.01	2,416	0.02	2,776	0.03
—Anglicanism	–	–	–	–	–	–	–	–	–	–	–	–	403	0.004	270	0.003	372	0.004
—Other Christians	–	–	2,795	0.03	–	–	–	–	–	–	–	–	17,396	0.2	38,175	0.4	54,981	0.6
Buddhism	–	–	–	–	–	–	–	–	–	–	–	–	5,223	0.05	9,758	0.1	11,042	0.1
Islam	–	–	–	–	–	–	–	–	–	–	–	–	3,201	0.03	5,579	0.1	7,983	0.1
Judaism	473,329	5.9	444,552	5.1	400,760	4.3	133,861	1.5	–	–	20,534	0.2	12,871	0.1	10,965	0.1	7,635	0.1
Hinduism	–	–	–	–	–	–	–	–	–	–	–	–	1,767	0.02	2,865	0.03	3,307	0.03
Other religions	–	–	594	0.01	–	–	8,678	0.1	–	–	–	–	3,376	0.03	17,921	0.2	85,646	0.9
No religion	–	–	1,959	0.02	3,841	0.04	12,287	0.1	–	–	–	–	1,483,369	14.5	1,806,409	18.2	1,549,610	16.1
Not stated	10,496	0.1	303	0.003	1,674	0.02	1,522	0.02	725,830	7.0	2,094,468	20.4	1,104,333	10.8	2,698,844	27.2	3,852,533	40.1
Total population	7,986,875		8,685,109		9,316,074		9,204,799		10,369,000		10,267,000		10,198,315		9,937,628		9,603,634	

=== Line chart of the trends, 1920–2022 ===
Census statistics 1920–2022:

View source data.
Catholicism
Protestantism
Judaism
Not religious
Religion not stated

=== Religion by administrative division ===
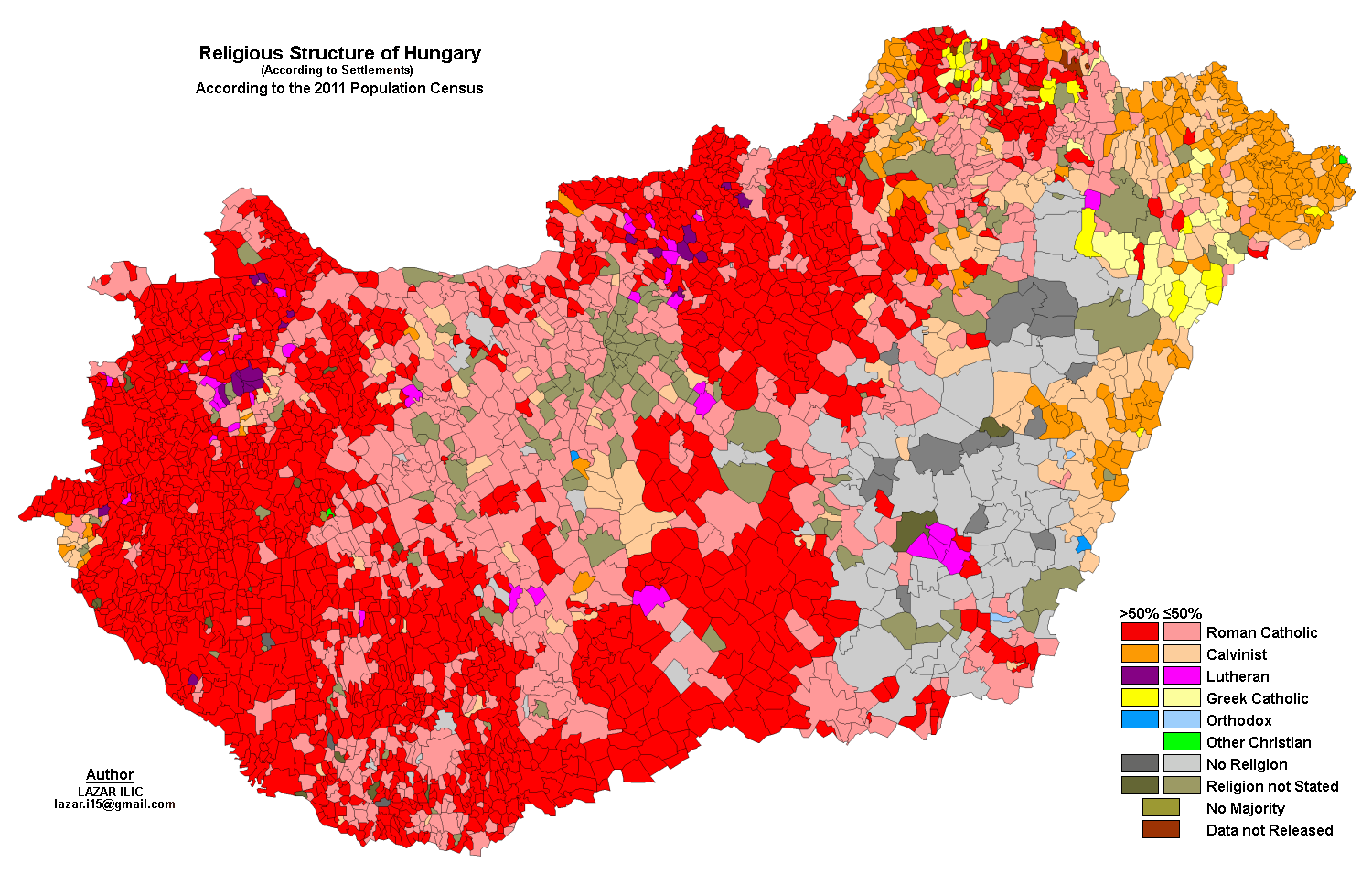
Distribution of religions and irreligion in Hungary, 2011 census.

Religious affiliations in Hungary by region and county, 2022 census
Religion	Christianity		Catholicism		Calvinism		Lutheranism		Orthodox Christianity		Other Christians		Judaism		Other religions		Not religious		Not answered	
Religion	Number	%	Number	%	Number	%	Number	%	Number	%	Number	%	Number	%	Number	%	Number	%	Number	%
Budapest / Central Hungary	594,988	35.3	408,823	24.3	126,920	7.5	26,162	1.5	4,839	0.3	28,244	1.7	4,839	0.3	12,076	0.7	324,157	19.2	749,282	44.5
Pest County	560,881	42.1	378,260	28.4	127,504	9.6	29,490	2.2	2,084	0.2	23,543	1.2	861	0.1	4,206	0.3	215,027	16.1	552,558	41.4
Central Transdanubia	433,703	41.1	311,825	29.5	88,926	8.4	19,593	1.9	1,101	0.1	12,258	1.2	322	0.03	2,444	0.2	181,362	17.2	437,817	41.5
Fejér County	157,600	38.0	112,374	27.1	38,548	9.3	6,132	1.5	546	0.1	4,830	1.2	137	0.03	1,001	0.2	82,154	19.8	173,934	41.9
Komárom-Esztergom County	112,718	37.5	80,049	26.6	25,763	8.6	3,405	1.1	219	0.1	3,282	1.1	91	0.03	713	0.2	57,817	19.2	129,292	43.0
Veszprém County	158,555	47.3	119,402	35.6	24,615	7.3	10,056	3.0	336	0.1	4,146	1.2	94	0.03	730	0.2	41,391	12.3	134,591	40.1
Western Transdanubia	516,879	52.9	441,540	45.2	29,501	3.0	34,987	3.6	985	0.1	9,866	1.0	306	0.03	1,680	0.2	86,147	8.8	371,246	38.0
Győr-Moson-Sopron County	233,808	50.2	193,990	41.6	16,309	3.5	18,696	4.0	385	0.1	4,428	0.9	138	0.03	842	0.2	47,533	10.2	183,624	39.4
Vas County	142,674	57.2	120,122	48.1	6,870	2.7	12,947	5.2	315	0.1	2,420	1.0	72	0.03	430	0.2	16,539	6.6	89,798	36.0
Zala County	140,397	56.8	127,428	51.5	6,322	2.6	3,344	1.3	285	0.1	3,018	1.2	96	0.04	408	0.2	22,075	8.9	97,824	39.6
Southern Transdanubia	395,377	46.2	321,308	37.6	49,727	5.8	13,316	1.6	590	0.1	10,436	1.2	278	0.03	2,198	0.3	124,936	14.6	332,634	38.9
Baranya County	153,717	43.4	126,403	35.7	18,718	5.3	3,393	1.0	292	0.1	4,911	1.4	114	0.03	1,192	0.3	56,491	16.0	142,508	40.2
Somogy County	144,821	49.3	119,740	40.8	17,123	5.8	4,610	1.6	141	0.1	3,207	1.1	126	0.04	700	0.2	36,346	12.4	111,477	38.0
Tolna County	96,836	46.6	75,165	36.1	13,886	6.7	5,313	2.6	157	0.1	2,318	1.1	38	0.02	306	0.1	32,099	15.4	78,649	37.8
Northern Hungary	541,744	49.6	396,575	36.3	118,789	10.9	9,701	0.9	706	0.1	15,973	1.5	282	0.03	1,824	0.2	130,695	12.0	416,830	38.2
Borsod-Abaúj-Zemplén County	316,075	50.7	203,081	32.6	102,718	16.5	2,646	0.4	406	0.1	7,224	1.2	162	0.03	847	0.1	67,947	10.9	237,993	38.2
Heves County	132,398	46.3	113,841	39.8	12,457	4.4	905	0.3	241	0.1	4,954	1.7	65	0.02	602	0.2	40,414	14.1	112,413	39.3
Nógrád County	96,839	52.1	79,653	42.8	3,614	1.9	6,150	3.3	59	0.03	3,795	2.0	55	0.03	375	0.2	22,334	12.0	66,424	35.7
Northern Great Plain	633,310	45.1	287,644	20.5	312,551	22.3	10,498	0.7	1,647	0.1	20,970	1.5	369	0.03	2,926	0.2	255,260	18.2	512,466	36.5
Hajdú-Bihar County	201,275	38.8	67,769	13.0	123,735	23.8	1,025	0.2	709	0.1	8,037	1.5	185	0.04	1,802	0.3	124,154	23.9	191,725	36.9
Jász-Nagykun-Szolnok County	119,424	33.6	83,078	23.3	31,361	8.8	1,031	0.3	274	0.1	3,680	1.0	80	0.02	635	0.2	91,131	25.6	144,539	40.6
Szabolcs-Szatmár-Bereg County	312,611	59.0	136,797	25.8	157,455	29.7	8,442	1.6	664	0.1	9,253	1.7	104	0.02	489	0.1	39,975	7.5	176,202	33.3
Southern Great Plain	486,997	40.5	340,644	28.3	90,064	7.5	32,756	2.7	3,626	0.3	19,907	1.7	378	0.03	2,623	0.2	232,026	19.3	479,700	39.9
Bács-Kiskun County	235,297	47.5	179,367	36.2	36,388	7.3	10,411	2.1	392	0.1	8,739	1.8	136	0.03	882	0.2	60,084	12.1	198,919	40.2
Békés County	105,964	33.6	47,231	15.0	31,842	10.1	19,376	6.1	2,426	0.8	5,089	1.6	48	0.02	492	0.2	91,952	29.2	116,766	37.0
Csongrád-Csanád County	145,736	37.3	114,046	29.1	21,834	5.6	2,969	0.8	808	0.2	6,079	1.5	194	0.1	1,249	0.3	79,990	20.4	164,015	41.9

=== Religion by age group ===
Religious affiliations in Hungary by age group, census 2022
Religion	<10		10–19		20–29		30–39		40–49		50–59		60–69		70–79		80–89		90+	
Religion	Number	%	Number	%	Number	%	Number	%	Number	%	Number	%	Number	%	Number	%	Number	%	Number	%
Christianity	303,611	32.7	370,697	39.0	352,690	32.8	439,888	35.5	621,484	39.5	583,860	45.2	648,077	53.1	549,142	61.8	256,713	68.0	37,420	65.9
—Catholicism	205,140	22.1	247,823	26.1	235,300	21.9	299,833	24.2	430,192	27.4	408,437	31.6	462,526	37.9	390,076	43.9	180,670	47.9	26,622	46.9
—Calvinism	71,706	7.7	90,088	9.5	83,899	7.8	101,809	8.2	138,771	8.8	128,333	9.9	140,928	11.5	121,973	13.7	58,087	15.4	8,388	14.8
—Lutheranism	13,755	1.5	16,857	1.8	13,639	1.3	17,418	1.4	25,907	1.7	22,528	1.7	26,569	2.2	25,037	2.8	12,808	3.4	1,985	3.5
—Other Christians	13,010	1.4	15,929	1.7	19,852	1.6	20,828	1.9	26,614	1.7	24,562	1.9	18,054	1.5	12,056	1.4	5,148	1.4	425	0.7
Judaism	391	0.04	565	0.1	615	0.1	838	0.1	1,456	0.1	949	0.1	940	0.1	1,270	0.1	457	0.1	154	0.3
Other religions	1,429	0.2	2,159	0.2	6,529	0.6	6,030	0.5	6,478	0.4	4,523	0.4	1,960	0.2	712	0.1	140	0.04	17	0.03
No religion	230,454	24.8	185,261	19.5	214,550	29.9	236,889	19.1	266,436	16.9	179,405	13.9	141,745	11.6	71,696	8.1	20,218	5.4	2,956	5.2
Not stated	393,043	42.3	391,674	41.2	501,108	46.6	555,912	44.9	676,210	43.0	523,804	40.5	428,955	35.1	266,008	29.9	99,843	26.5	15,976	28.1
Total population	928,928		950,356		1,075,492		1,239,557		1,572,064		1,292,541		1,221,677		888,828		377,371		56,820	

=== Religion by education group ===
Religious affiliations in Hungary by education group, census 2022
Religion	Lower primary school		Upper primary school		Professional secondary school professional diploma		General secondary school maturity diploma		University or college		Person under 15 school career underway	
Religion	Number	%	Number	%	Number	%	Number	%	Number	%	Number	%
Christianity	82,817	44.2	832,462	47.8	770,849	44.5	1,151,667	42.4	838,003	45.7	488,072	35.0
—Catholicism	56,982	30.4	583,111	33.5	552,729	31.9	793,242	29.2	571,754	31.2	328,801	23.6
—Calvinism	19,917	10.6	189,941	10.9	164,108	9.5	264,184	9.7	189,583	10.3	116,249	8.3
—Lutheranism	2,089	1.1	29,954	1.7	29,577	1.7	49,818	1.8	42,727	2.3	22,338	1.6
—Other Christians	3,829	2.0	29,465	1.7	24,435	1.4	44,423	1.6	33,939	1.8	20,684	1.5
Judaism	180	0.1	605	0.03	443	0.03	2,132	0.1	3,599	0.2	676	0.1
Other religions	536	0.3	2,471	0.1	2,651	0.1	10,629	0.4	11,451	0.6	2,239	0.2
No religion	22,824	12.2	243,698	14.0	255,187	14.7	421,929	15.5	284,508	15.5	321,464	23.1
Not stated	80,911	43.2	660,219	38.0	704,637	40.6	1,129,830	41.6	696,155	38.0	580,781	41.7
Total population	187,268		1,739,464		1,733,767		2,716,187		1,833,716		1,393,232	

=== Typology of belief ===
Types of belief in Hungary (Századvég 2020)
1. Christianity (42.1%)
2. Syncretism (27.9%)
3. Esotericism (5.30%)
4. Non-believers (24.7%)

In 2020, the outcomes of a large-sampled (53,061 people) and in depth survey on the religiousness, or beliefs, of the Hungarians were published by the Századvég Foundation in the sociological studies book Vallásosság Magyarországon. The outcomes of the survey show that while traditional Christian religiousness is witnessing an "observable disavowal" in Hungarian society, the latter may not be considered averse to belief, and large segments of the population held syncretic or "patchwork" beliefs, i.e. mixtures of theorems from various religious traditions, or esoteric beliefs, i.e. beliefs based on theorems such as reincarnation and astrology, rather than being sheer non-believers. Specifically, 42.1% of the Hungarians were Christians, of whom 27% were fully devout Christians, i.e. fully believing in the theorems of Christian theology, and 15.1% were partially devout Christians, i.e. only believing in some theorems of Christian theology; at the same time, 27.9% of the Hungarians were syncretists, 5.3% were esotericists, and 24.7% were sheer non-believers.

Types of belief in Hungary by age groups, Századvég 2020
Type of belief	18–29	30–39	40–49	50–59	60+
Christianity	38.0	35.1	36.0	46.4	49.7
—Fully believing Christians	23.6	23.2	20.4	31.2	32.8
—Partially believing Christians	14.4	11.9	15.6	15.2	16.9
Syncretism	27.3	32.6	37.1	28.5	19.8
Esotericism	8.5	6.7	6.7	2.9	3.2
Non-believers	26.2	25.6	20.2	22.2	27.2

== Religious organisations ==
=== Registers of government-recognised churches ===
Officially registered religious organisations (churches) in Hungary, according to the laws on churches of the Constitution of Hungary effective since 2012 (Note: The Constitution of Hungary adopted in the first half of 2011 and effective since early 2012 implemented new laws on religious organisations (2011 Act CCVI), including stricter criteria for their official registration with the status of incorporated "church" (egyház), which entails various privileges including the access to state funding. Thirty-two churches were registered according to the new laws, while many religious organisations which before 2012 had been granted official registration, lost their status and privileges once the new laws were implemented. Some of these organisations merged with larger ones which remained registered as incorporated churches (for instance, this was the case with various Buddhist groups), while others continued to operate under the laws on associations, as "associations conducting religious activities" but not as officially registered incorporated churches.) In sequence according to the respective registration number	Type
00001/2012. Hungarian Catholic Church (Magyar Katolikus Egyház)	Christianity
00002/2012. Hungarian Reformed (Calvinist) Church (Magyarországi Református Egyház)	Christianity
00003/2012. Hungarian Evangelical (Lutheran) Church (Magyarországi Evangélikus Egyház)	Christianity
00004/2012. Association of Hungarian Jewish Faith Communities (Magyarországi Zsidó Hitközségek Szövetsége)	Judaism
00005/2012. United Hungarian Israelite Faith Community (Egységes Magyarországi Izraelita Hitközség)	Judaism
00006/2012. Hungarian Autonomous Orthodox Israelite Faith Community (Magyarországi Autonóm Orthodox Izraelita Hitközség)	Judaism
00007/2012. Serbian Orthodox Diocese of Buda (Budai Szerb Ortodox Egyházmegye)	Christianity
00008/2012. Ecumenical Patriarchate of Constantinople – Hungarian Orthodox Exarchate (Konstantinápolyi Egyetemes Patriarchátus – Magyarországi Ortodox Exarchátus)	Christianity
00009/2012. Hungarian Bulgarian Orthodox Church (Magyarországi Bolgár Ortodox Egyház)	Christianity
00010/2012. Hungarian Romanian Orthodox Diocese (Magyarországi Román Ortodox Egyházmegye)	Christianity
00011/2012. Hungarian Diocese of the Russian Orthodox Church – Moscow Patriarchate (Orosz Ortodox Egyház Magyar Egyházmegyéje – Moszkvai Patriarchátus)	Christianity
00012/2012. Hungarian Unitarian Church (Magyar Unitárius Egyház)	Christianity
00013/2012. Hungarian Baptist Church (Magyarországi Baptista Egyház)	Christianity
00014/2012. Faith Church (Hit Gyülekezete)	Christianity
00015/2012. Hungarian Methodist Church (Magyarországi Metodista Egyház)	Christianity
00016/2012. Hungarian Pentecostal Church (Magyar Pünkösdi Egyház)	Christianity
00017/2012. Saint Margaret Anglican Episcopal Church (Szent Margit Anglikán Episzkopális Egyház)	Christianity
00018/2012. Transylvanian Church (Erdélyi Gyülekezet)	Christianity
00019/2012. Seventh-day Adventist Church (Hetednapi Adventista Egyház)	Christianity
00020/2012. Hungarian Coptic Orthodox Church (Magyarországi Kopt Ortodox Egyház)	Christianity
00021/2012. Hungarian Islamic Fellowship (Magyar Iszlám Közösség)	Islam
00022/2012. Church of Hungarian Muslims (Magyarországi Muszlimok Egyháza)	Islam
00023/2012. Christ-believing Nazarene Churches (Krisztusban Hívő Nazarénus Gyülekezetek)	Christianity
00024/2012. Hungarian Fellowship of Krishna-conscious Believers (Magyarországi Krisna-tudatú Hívők Közössége)	Hinduism
00025/2012. Free Church of the Salvation Army in Hungary (Üdvhadsereg Szabadegyház Magyarország)	Christianity
00026/2012. The Church of Jesus Christ of Latter-day Saints (Az Utolsó Napok Szentjeinek Jézus Krisztus Egyháza)	Christianity
00027/2012. Hungarian Church of Jehovah's Witnesses (Magyarországi Jehova Tanúi Egyház)	Christianity
00028/2012. Knowledge Gate Buddhist Church (Tan Kapuja Buddhista Egyház)	Buddhism
00029/2012. Buddhist Mission, Hungarian Arya Maitreya Mandala Church Fellowship (Buddhista Misszió, Magyarországi Árya Maitreya Mandala Egyházközösség)	Buddhism
00030/2012. Hungarian Karma Kagyüpa Buddhist Fellowship (Magyarországi Karma Kagyüpa Buddhista Közösség)	Buddhism
00031/2012. Hungarian Chinese Chan Buddhist Church (Magyarországi Kínai Chanbuddhista Egyház)	Buddhism
00032/2012. Diamond Way Buddhist Fellowship (Gyémánt Út Buddhista Közösség)	Buddhism
Main other religious organisations (churches) in Hungary as of 2004–2011, amongst those which were officially registered before the 2012 laws on churches In alphabetical sequence according to the names in Hungarian; the list may be intrinsically incomplete	Type
Ankh Church of Eternal Life (Ankh Örök Élet Egyháza)	Egyptian Kemetism
Traditional Church of the Legal Grounds of the Order of Árpád (Árpád Rendjének Jogalapja Tradicionális Egyház)	Ősmagyar vallás Hunnic Tengrism
Unification Church (Egyesítő Egyház)	Christianity
Church of the Universal Love (Egyetemes Szeretet Egyháza)	New Age; Spiritualism
Independent Spiritual Order of Human Possibility (Emberi Lehetőség Független Szellemi Rend)	New Age; Human Potential Movement
Church of Esoteric Teachings – Church of the Holy Crown (Ezoterikus Tanok Egyháza – Szent Korona Egyház)	Ősmagyar vallás Scythian-Hunnic Tengrism
Church of the Source (Forrás Egyháza)	New Age; Holistic syncretism
Church of the Fellowship of Believers in Alien, More Advanced Intelligences (Idegen, Fejlettebb Intelligenciákban Hívők Közössége Egyház)	New Age; Exotheology
Karma Decsen Özel Ling Tibetan Buddhist Fellowship (Karma Decsen Özel Ling Tibeti Buddhista Közösség)	Buddhism
Church of Celtic-Wiccan Tradition Keepers (Kelta-Wicca Hagyományőrzők Egyháza)	Wicca
Church of the Universal Love of the Cosmos (Kozmosz Univerzális Szeretet Egyház)	New Age; Protestantism
Association of Hungarian Witches (Magyar Boszorkányszövetség)	Contemporary witchcraft
Hungarian Taoist Church (Magyar Taoista Egyház)	Taoism
Hungarian Vaishnavite Hindu Church (Magyar Vaisnava Hindu Egyház)	Hinduism
Hungarian Religious Fellowship (Magyar Vallás Közössége)	Ősmagyar vallás Sumerian Zuism
Hungarian Baháʼí Fellowship (Magyarországi Baháʼí Közösség)	Baháʼí Faith
Hungarian Evangelical Brotherhood (Magyarországi Evangéliumi Testvérközösség)	Christianity
Hungarian Pantholocatholic Traditional Church (Magyarországi Pantholokatholikus Tradicionális Egyház)	New Age; Belief in God
Hungarian Church of Scientology (Magyarországi Szcientológia Egyház)	Scientology
Hungarian Xuyun Buddhist Chan Central Church (Magyarországi Xuyun Buddhista Chan Központi Egyház)	Buddhism
Menorah Messianic Fellowship (Menóra Messiási Közösség)	Messianic Judaism
Om Vishwa Guru Deep Hindu Religious Fellowship (Om Vishwa Guru Deep Hindu Vallási Közösség)	Hinduism
Old Hungarian Church (Ősmagyar Egyház)	Ősmagyar vallás Sumerian Zuism
Old Hungarian Taltos Church (Ősmagyar Táltos Egyház)	Ősmagyar vallás Uralic-Siberian Tengrism
Sodalitas Mithraica Confessing Church (Sodalitas Mithraica Hitvalló Egyház)	Roman-Iranian Mithraism
Szangye Menlai Gedün, Healing Buddha Fellowship (Szangye Menlai Gedün, a Gyógyító Buddha Közössége)	Buddhism
Tenzin Sedrup Ling Rimé Buddhist Centre (Tenzin Sedrup Ling Rimé Buddhista Centrum)	Buddhism
Church of the Pure Souls (Tiszta Lelkű Emberek Egyháza)	Christianity
Church of the Hun Universe – Holy Mother Church of the Huns (Hun Univerzum Egyháza – Hunok Anyaszentegyháza)	Ősmagyar vallás Hunnic Tengrism
Hungarian Fellowship of Vishwa Nirmala Dharma (Vishwa Nirmala Dharma Magyarországi Közössége)	Hinduism
Yotengrit Church of the Ancestral Spirit of the Endless Sea (Yotengrit Tengervégtelen Ős-szellem Egyháza)	Ősmagyar vallás Uralic-Siberian Tengrism

=== Voluntary tax offering to churches ===
Hungarian citizens are entitled to voluntarily donate 1% of their yearly income tax to officially registered religious organisations (churches) of their choice; in 2023, donations were distributed as follows.

2023 1% tax offering by Hungarian citizens to religious organisations (churches)
Religious organisation	Type	Donation In million HUF	Number of donors
Hungarian Catholic Church (Magyar Katolikus Egyház)	Christianity	6048	803,070
Hungarian Reformed (Calvinist) Church (Magyarországi Református Egyház)	Christianity	2657	348,482
Hungarian Evangelical (Lutheran) Church (Magyarországi Evangélikus Egyház)	Christianity	743	92,581
Hungarian Evangelical Brotherhood (Magyarországi Evangéliumi Testvérközösség)	Christianity	718	73,381
Hungarian Fellowship of Krishna-conscious Believers (Magyarországi Krisna-tudatú Hívők Közössége)	Hinduism	691	86,005
Hungarian Baptist Church (Magyarországi Baptista Egyház)	Christianity	461	56,294
Knowledge Gate Buddhist Church (Tan Kapuja Buddhista Egyház)	Buddhism	290	33,566
Diamond Way Buddhist Fellowship (Gyémánt Út Buddhista Közösség)	Buddhism	203	24,377
Faith Church (Hit Gyülekezete)	Christianity	169	36,108
Association of Hungarian Jewish Religious Communities (Magyarországi Zsidó Hitközségek Szövetsége)	Judaism	131	12,612
Hungarian Church of Jehovah's Witnesses (Magyarországi Jehova Tanúi Egyház)	Christianity	82	14,672
Transylvanian Church (Erdélyi Gyülekezet)	Christianity	77	9,398
Buddhist Mission, Hungarian Arya Maitreya Mandala Church Fellowship (Buddhista Misszió, Magyarországi Árya Maitreya Mandala Egyházközösség)	Buddhism	75	9,396
