= World Turks Qurultai =

International organisation

The World Turks Qurultai (Note: Kyrgyz: Дүйнөлүк Түрк Курултайы, Düýnölük Türk Kurultaýy, دۉينۅلۉک تۉرک قۇرۇلتاي; Kazakh: Дүниежүзілік Түркі Құрылтайы, Du'ni'eju'zilik Tu'rki Quryltai'y, دٷنٸەجٷزٸلٸک تٷرکٸ قۇرىلتايى; Russian: Всемирный Тюркский Курултай, Vsemirnyj Türkskij Kurultaj; Turkish: Dünya Türk Kurultayı; abbreviated WTQ; also translated as World Turks Qurultay, World Turkic Qurultai and World Turkic Qurultay) is an international organisation of Turkic peoples. The World Turks Qurultai describes itself as "an international non-political platform designed to unite all the Turk people for cultural and spiritual integration." The first annual World Turks Qurultai was held in July 2017.

== Goals ==
The goals of the World Turks Qurultai were outlined by the organizing committee in advance of the first meeting.

1. Spiritual and cultural consolidation of the Turkic people for the name of common progress.
2. Assistance to the development of the Turkic peoples.
3. Preservation and revival of the culture of the Turkic peoples by creating sustainable cultural relations between them.
4. Enshrinement of the "World Turks Qurultai" as a regular international event.
5. Ensuring the regular holding of the "World Turks Qurultai".

== World Turks Qurultai 2017 ==
The first World Turks Qurultai was planned to be held in the city of Cholpon-Ata in the mountains of Kyrgyzstan in July 2017. Representatives of all Turkic peoples were invited, including heads and representatives of public organizations, scientists and artists.

More than 160 delegates from 20 Turkic peoples attended, including representatives of the Turkish Cypriots, and the republics of Yakutia and Tuva.

=== Relocation to Kazakhstan ===
Reports of a bomb being planted at the original host city of Cholpon-Ata in Kyrgyzstan meant that the meeting was moved to the city of Almaty in Kazakhstan.

The Declaration was the outcome of talks between the delegates at the first World Turks Qurultai, and included the following declarations:

- Recognize the Supreme Expert Council as the executive agency of the World Turks Qurultai, acting on an ongoing basis;
- Take note of the contents of the materials of Qurultai, as a document that determines the direction of common actions;
- To promote the creation of a World Nomadic Culture Center on the territory of Kazakhstan (Astana), from each of the Turk peoples to provide thematic filling of its ethnic sections;
- To initiate the holding of the World Turk Games on a regular basis in different countries of the world;
- To put forward at the level of the First Persons of the states the initiative to create a single Turk alphabet;
- Take measures to support small Turk ethnic groups in the preservation and development of national culture and values. Especially pay attention to the fate of the disappearing Turk peoples, namely, the Shorians and Tofalar;
- To create a Council of progressive youth within the framework of the World Turks Qurultai, with the purpose of broadcasting ideas of the revival of the Turk world among the younger generation.
- Make the World Turks Qurultai annual;
- In order to ensure the effective implementation of the above tasks, a Leader is needed at the level of the First Person of the State. For the services to the Turk peoples it is proposed to support the repeated voiced initiatives of many participants of the World Turks Qurultai about awarding the status of “Turk El Ata”.

== See also ==
- Kurultai
- Great Kurultaj
- Turkic peoples
