= Great Kurultáj =

Hungarian annual traditional event for people of Central Asian nomadic origins

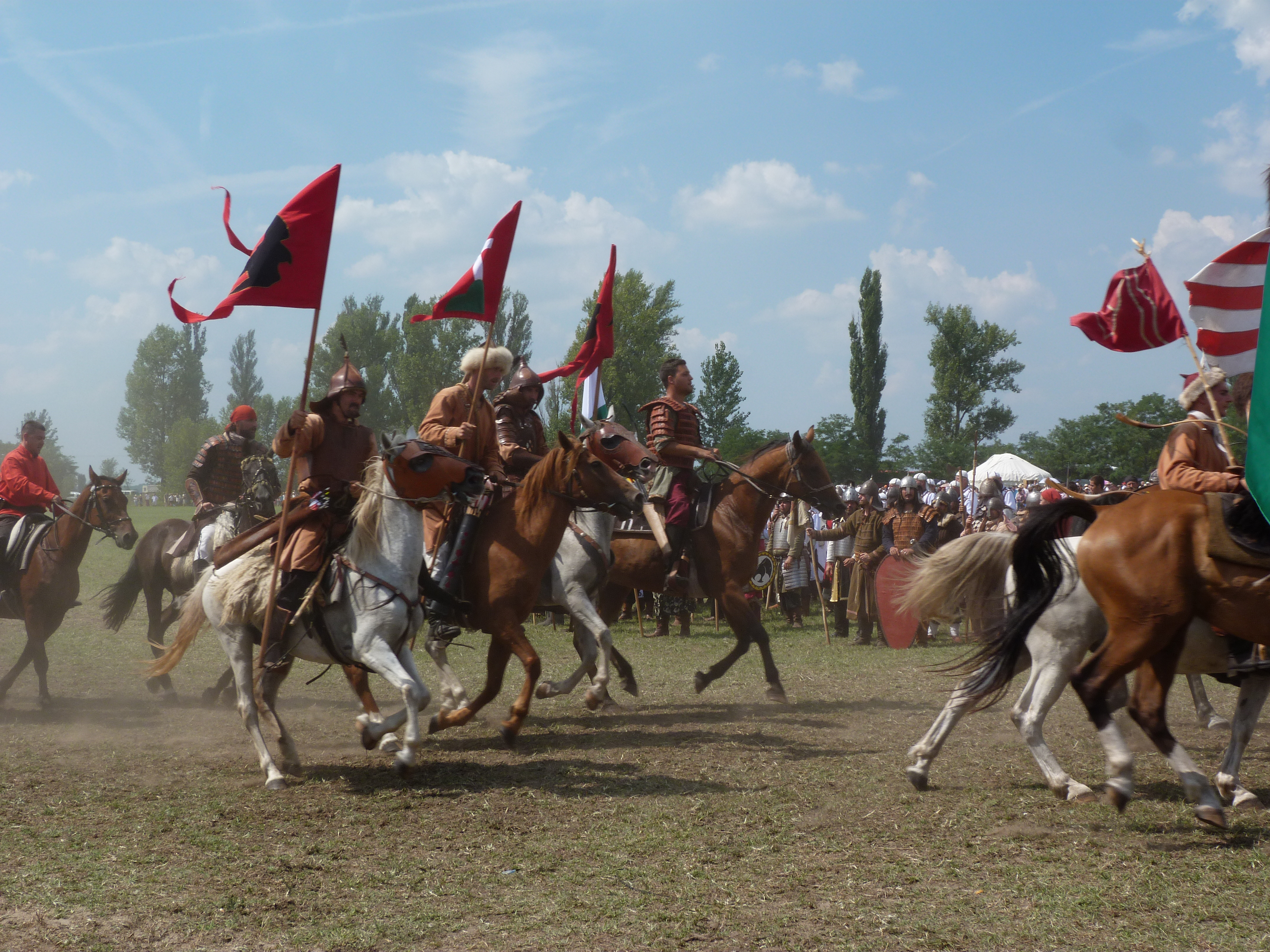
Kurultáj - Nations parade

The Great Kurultáj, or simply Kurultáj, is a traditional event of Central Asian nomadic origins, which takes place in the first week of August in Bugac, Hungary. The aim of this event is to strengthen the unity of the Eurasian steppe-nomadic horse culture and traditions among Hungarians and their cultural relatives, including Eastern Turkic peoples and Uralic peoples. The first Kurultáj was held in the Torgay Region of Kazakhstan in 2007. Kurultáj is an event for professional horsemen and fans of horse riding. Each Kurultáj holds the parade of horsemen, horse races, traditional horsemen wrestling and various tournaments. The first Kurultáj in Hungary was held in 2008.

Hungary is the only European nation to have preserved the traditional kokpar game, a strategic team sport for riders.

== Background ==
The original Kurultáj were held by nomadic people of the Steppes, especially for various chieftains to gather to elect the successor to a recently deceased Khan. The word "kurultáj" and its variations in the Turkic languages translates as "meeting of the tribes". It occurs amongst tribal nations and practically in all the nomadic cultures. Hungarian nomadic tribes also held these meetings, a fact that is mentioned in Byzantine and Arab written sources. At such meetings, important decisions were made, in particular, the leaders of the tribes would meet often to discuss military decisions and strategies.

=== Turanist ideology ===
The Great Kurultáj is based on Turanist pan-nationalism that promtes the idea of unity between the Hungarian and Turkic peoples, based on the Altaic language family which has been rejected by linguists. The Great Kurultáj has been criticized for historical revisionism as a way to embellish Hungarian history, and the event's political association with far-right politics.

== Participating nations and states ==
A total of 13 nations and 33 states participate.

Participating nations:

1. Asia (6):Uzbekistan, Kyrgyzstan, Turkmenistan, South Korea, Mongolia
2. Europe (7): Kazakhstan, Azerbaijan, Turkey, Hungary, Estonia, Finland, Bulgaria, Greece

=== Turkic nations and states (22) ===
- Azerbaijan
- Balkar
- Bashkortostan
- Chuvashia
- Crimean Tatars
- Cypriot Turks
- Gagauzia
- Karachay
- Karakalpakstan
- Kazakhstan
- Kyrgyzstan
- Kumykia
- Madjars
- Nogai
- Sakha
- Tatarstan
- Turkey
- Tuva
- Turkmenistan
- Uyghurs
- Turkomans
- Uzbekistan

=== Uralic nations and states (11) ===
- Csangos
- Estonia
- Finland
- Hungary (Host)
- Karelians
- Khanty-Mansi
- Mari El
- Nenets
- Sápmi
- Szekely
- Komi

=== Mongolic nations and states (3) ===
- Buryatia
- Kalmykia
- Mongolia

=== Northeast Caucasian states (3) ===
- Avar
- Chechnya
- Dagestan

=== Northwest Caucasian states (2) ===
- Adygea
- Kabardin

=== Indo-European nations and states (3) ===
- Bulgaria
- Greece
- Hazara

=== Tungusic states (2) ===
- Evenki
- Manchus

=== Others (1) ===
- South Korea

== Events ==
- 2008: Unknown
- 2013: 9 to 11 August
- 2014: Took place at Bugac in the Southern Great Plain region in Hungary
- 2015: Organized by the Hungarian Turan Foundation with contributions from the Turkish Cooperation and Coordination Agency (TİKA) and named the year's event Ancestors Day. Representatives from the governments of Hungary and Turkey joined the festivities as well
- 2016: Took place from 12 to 14 August at Bugac
- 2018: Unknown
- 2020: Cancelled
- 2022: Culture + music + sports (horse + archery + Guresh)

Medalists:

== Gallery ==
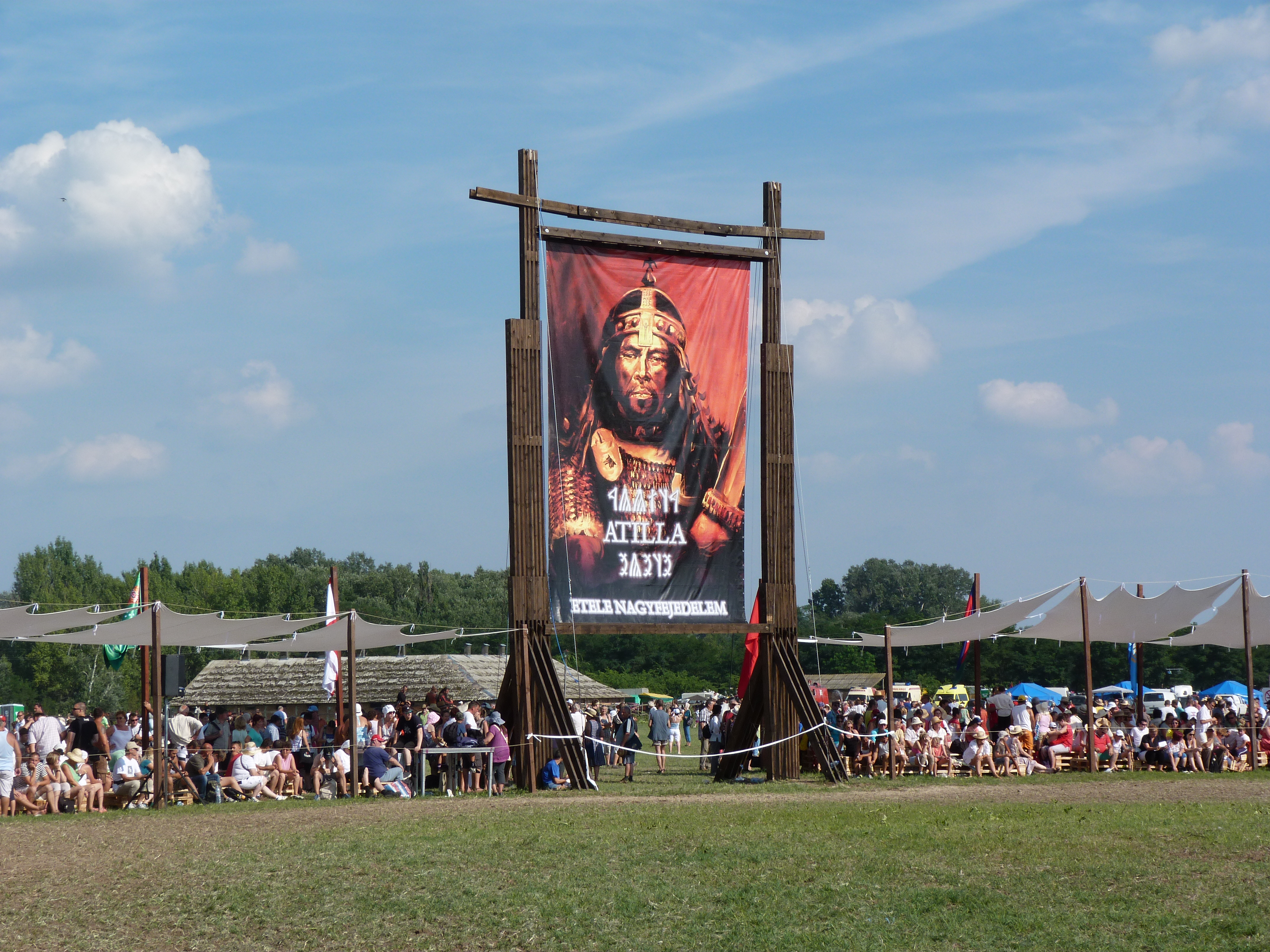
Atilla, emperor of the Hun Empire

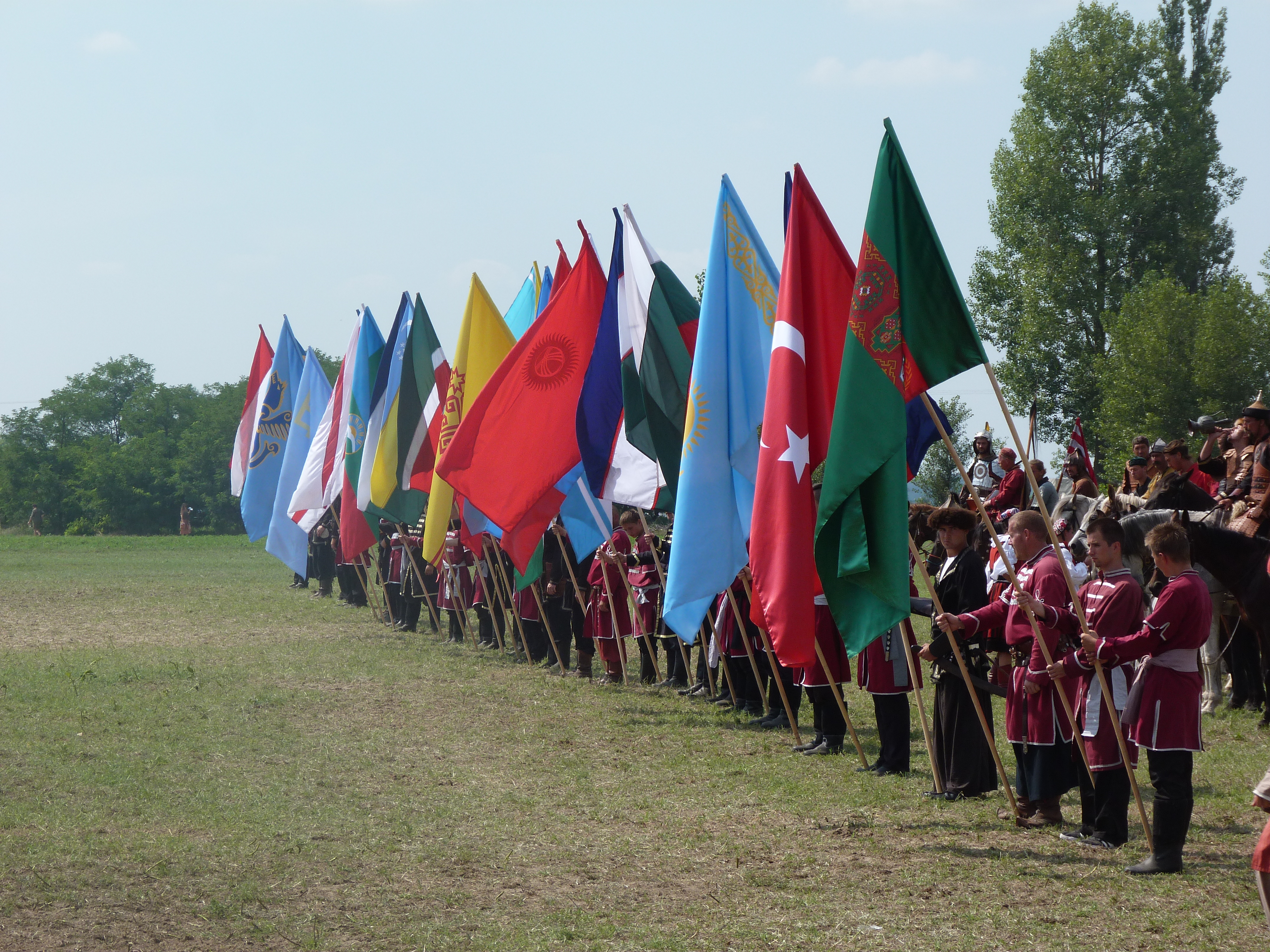
Flags of Turan nations

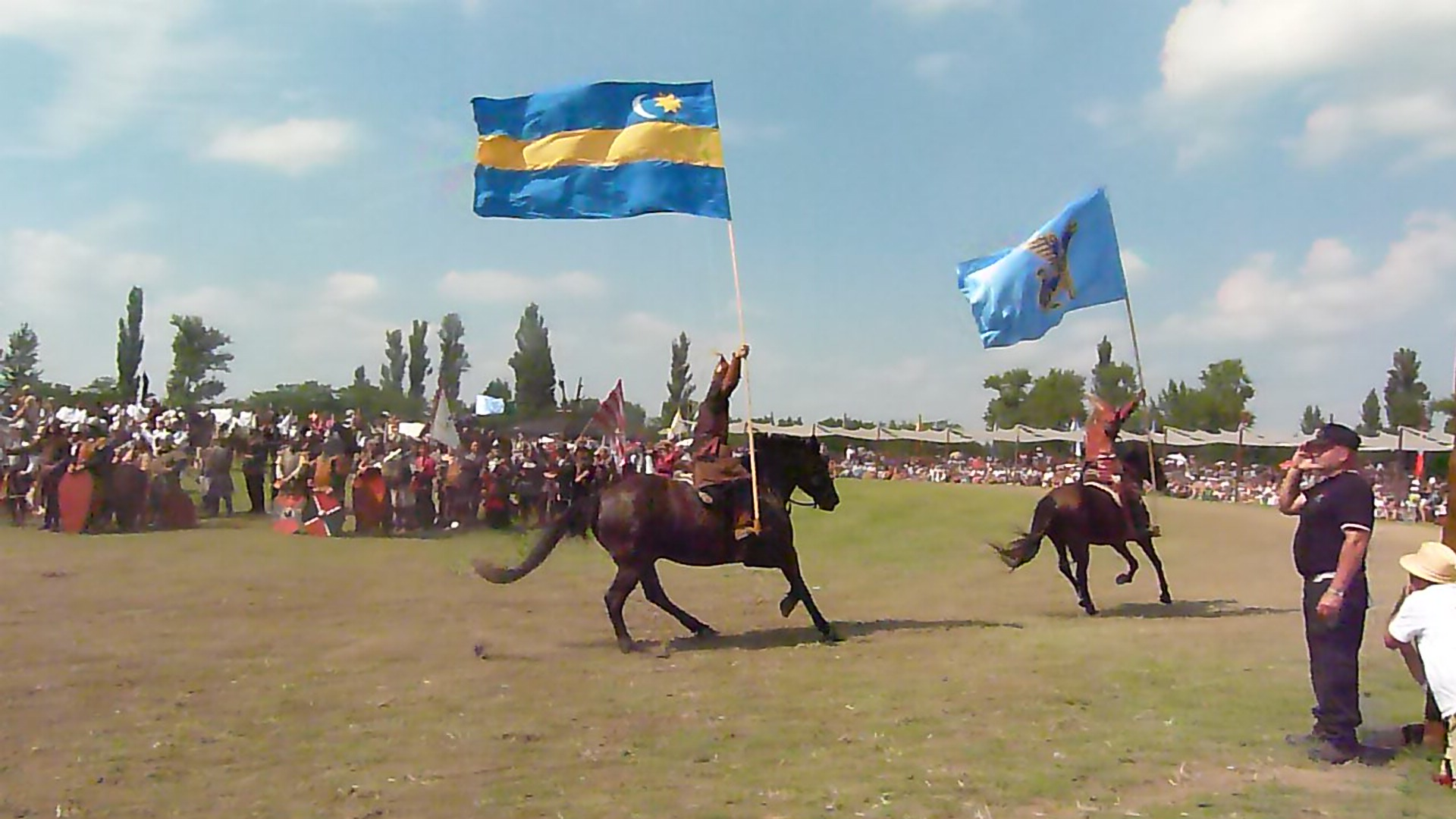
Flag of Székely Land

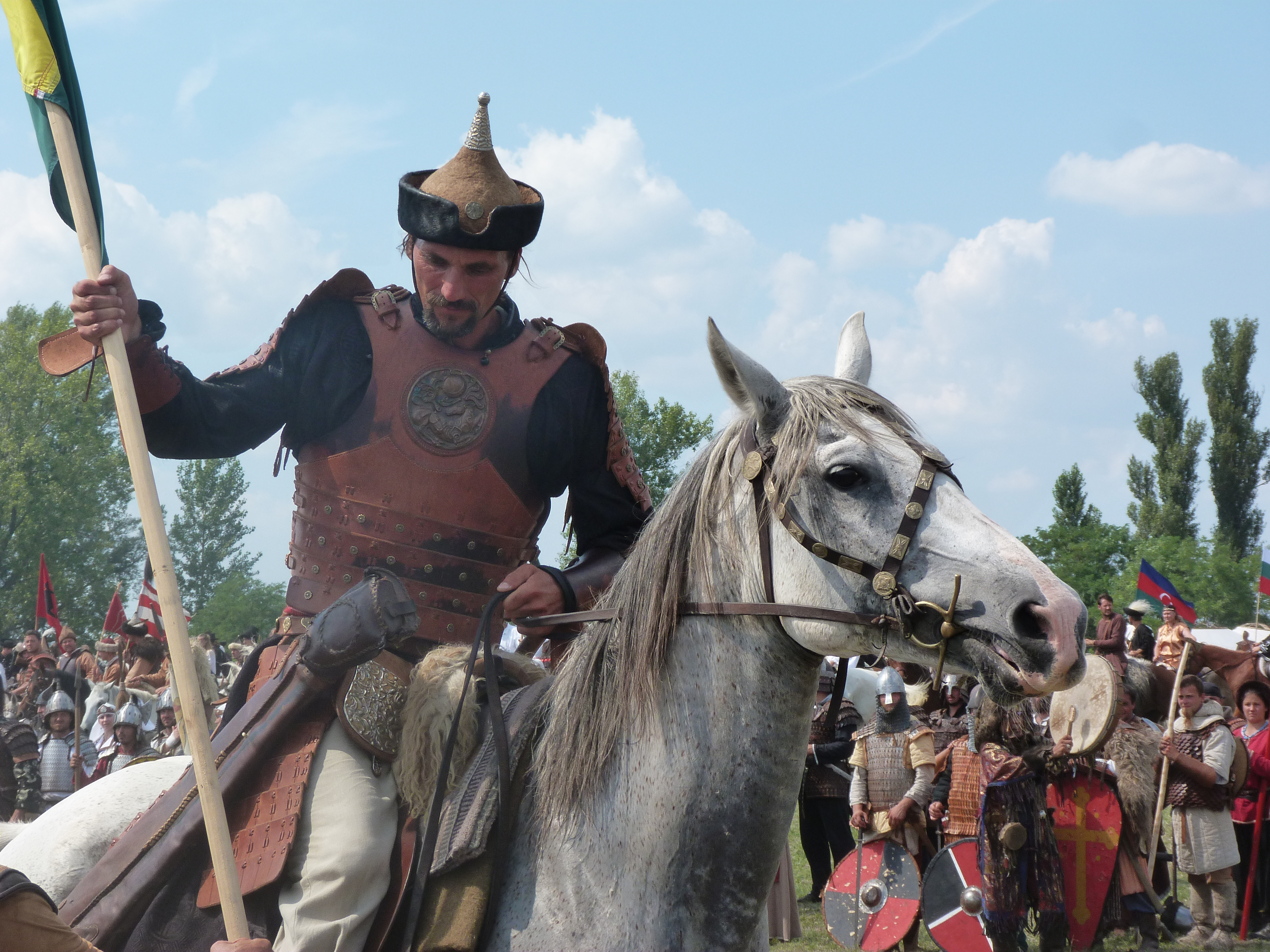
Hungarian horseman at Kurultáj

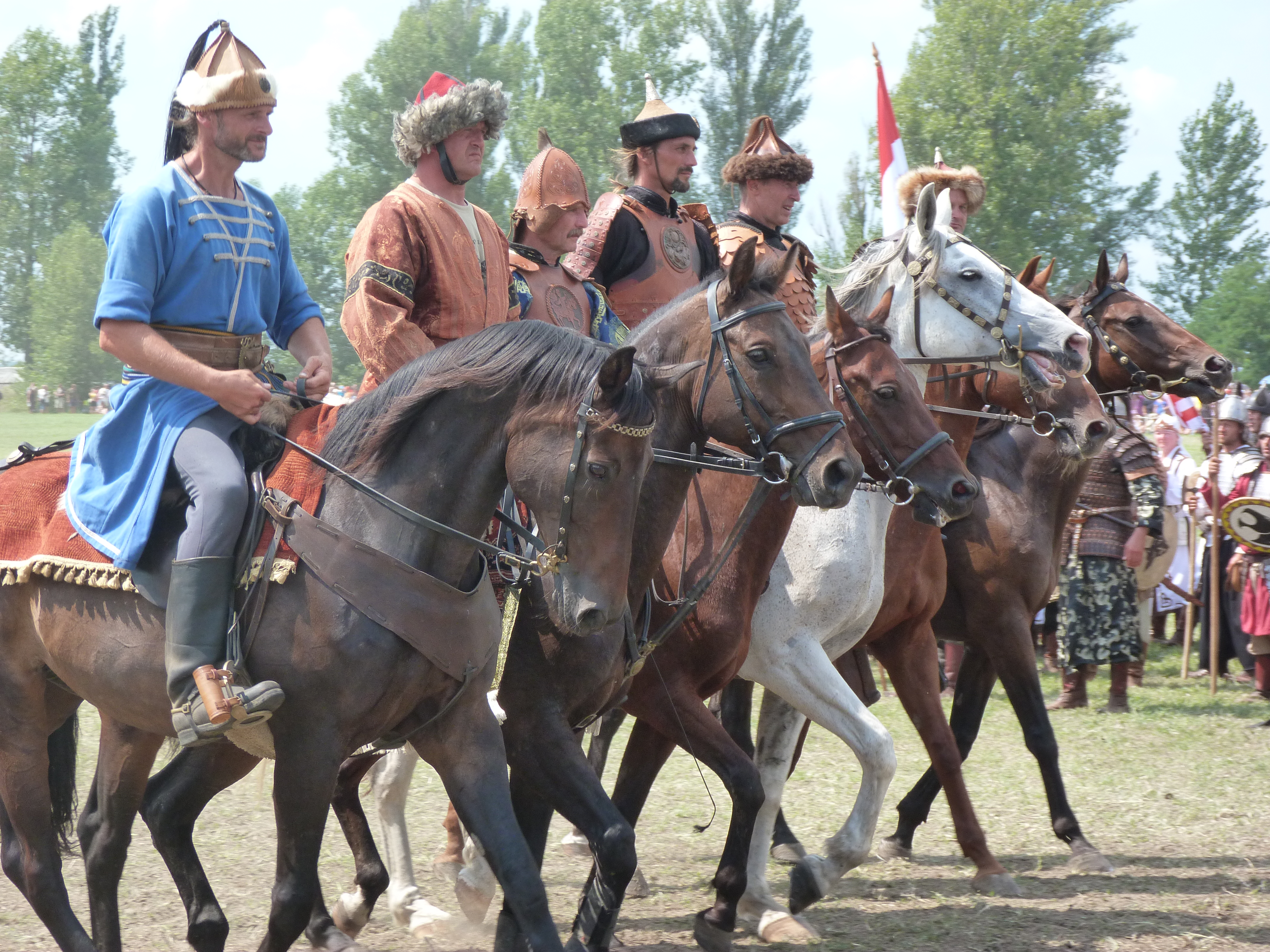
Hungarian horsemen at Kurultáj

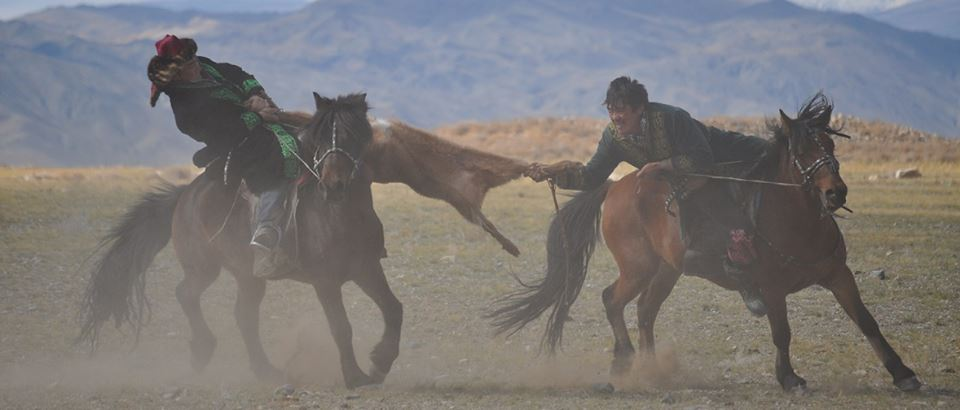
Traditional Kazakh game of Kokpar, fighting over a goat carcass at the Kazakh Altai Eagle Festival in Sagsai, Bayan-Ölgii Province, Mongolia

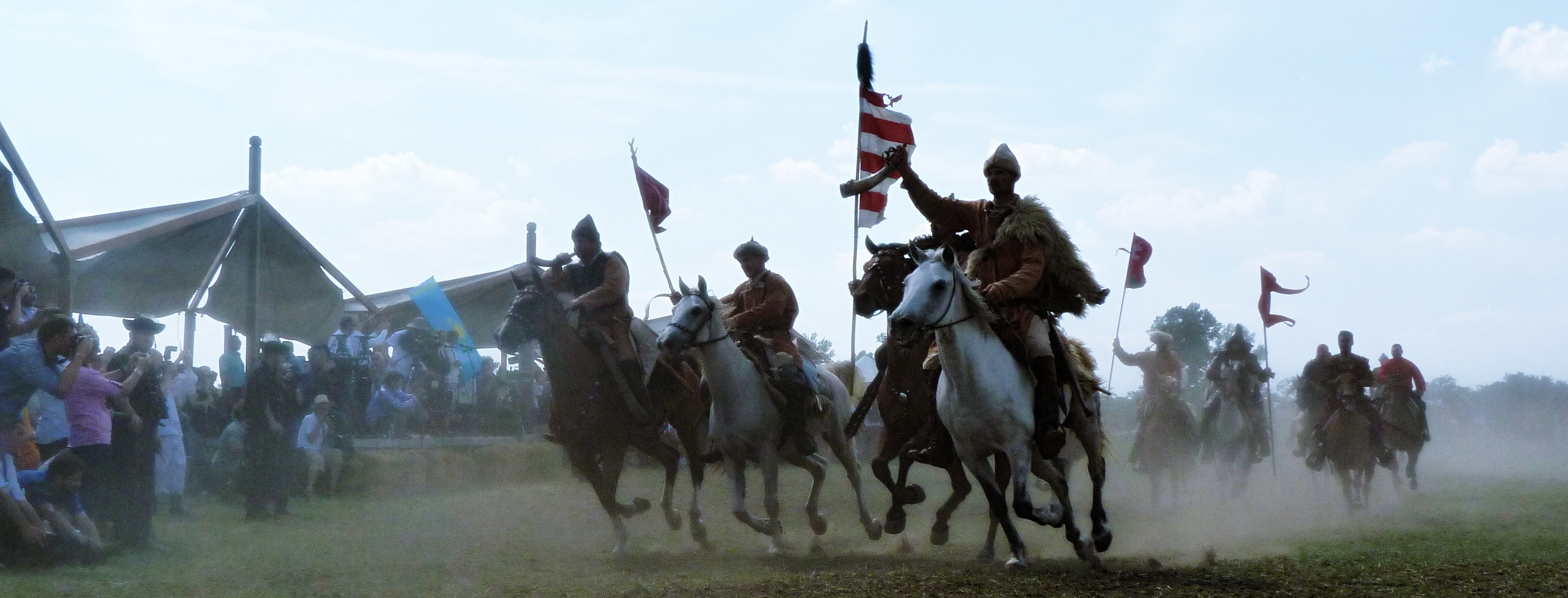
Hungarian horsemen at Great Kurultáj 2014, the Hun-Turkic tribal assembly, Bugac

== See also ==
- Altaic language
- Bugac
- Huns
- Jirga
- Pan-Turanism
- Pan Turkism
- World Turks Qurultai
- List of festivals in Asia
- List of festivals in Europe
