= Bugac =

Coordinates: 46°41′N 19°41′E

- Large village
- Coat of arms

- Location of Bugac
- Country: Hungary
- County: Bács-Kiskun
- District: Kiskunfélegyháza

Area
  - Total: 131.11 km^{2} (50.62 sq mi)

Population (2005)
  - Total: 3,006
  - Density: 22.96/km^{2} (59.5/sq mi)
- Time zone: UTC+1 (CET)
  - Summer (DST): UTC+2 (CEST)
- Postal code: 6114
- Area code: (+36) 76

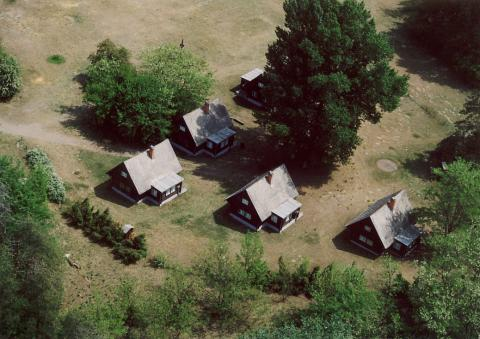
Aerial photo of four houses in Bugac (≤ 2007).

Bugac is a village in Bács-Kiskun county, in the Southern Great Plain region of southern Hungary.

It covers an area of 131.11 km^{2} (51 sq mi) and has a population of 2889 people (2010).

The surrounding area, Bugac puszta is the largest of seven disjoint units making up the Kiskunság National Park.

== History ==
Bugac was founded by the local government of Kecskemét, led by Kada Elek in 1909. Originally it belonged to Kecskemét province in the 19th century.

The Book of Dede Korkut, where the most famous among the epic stories of the Oghuz Turks are collected, mentions Bughachuk, which in Turkic languages is also spelled 'Buğac'. Therefore, many people tend to believe that these two proper names are correlated.

The Great Kurultáj (tribal assembly of the Hun – Turkic nations, celebration of the preservation of the ancient traditions) is usually hosted in this small town every 2 years.

== Countryside ==
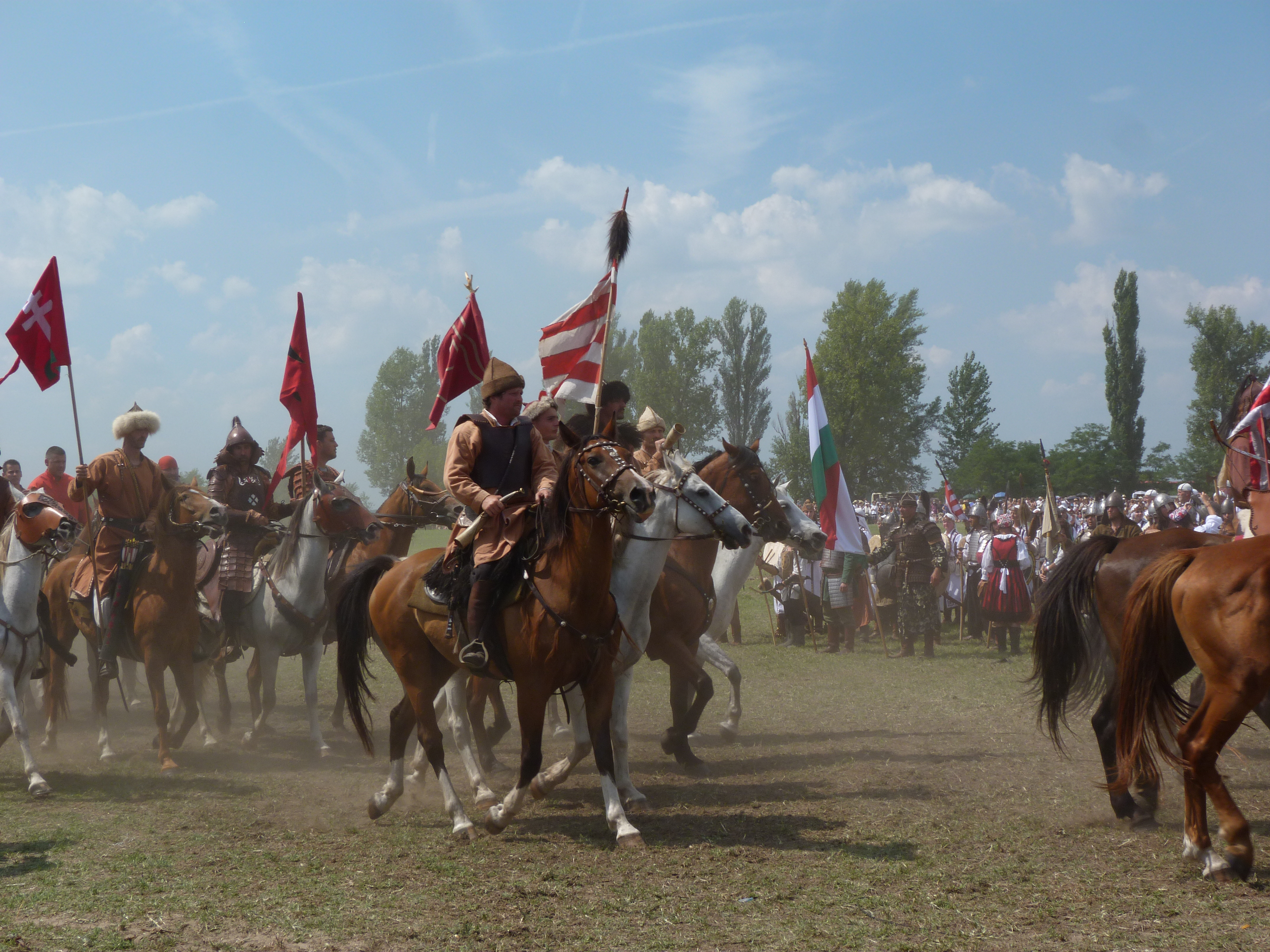
The traditional Great Kurultáj is also held here

Although Bugac is a part of the Great Plains it is known to have a few features distinct from the plains. Sand hills, created by strong winds, cover several square kilometers of the region, resulting in a unique landscape around the village. These hills range from 10 meters to 50 meters in height. Lack of vegetation due to the poor quality of the soil in this region caused sand hills, which continually shifted and flew with the winds.

In the eighteenth century, Maria Theresa decided to stop the sand winds by afforestation. Bugac is now surrounded by forests which cover the sand hills around the countryside. This unique land form is different from the Hortobágy National Park. Bugac is the part of the Kiskunsagi National Park which is the second national park of Hungary, founded in 1975. The first national park was of the Hortobágy National Park in 1973.
