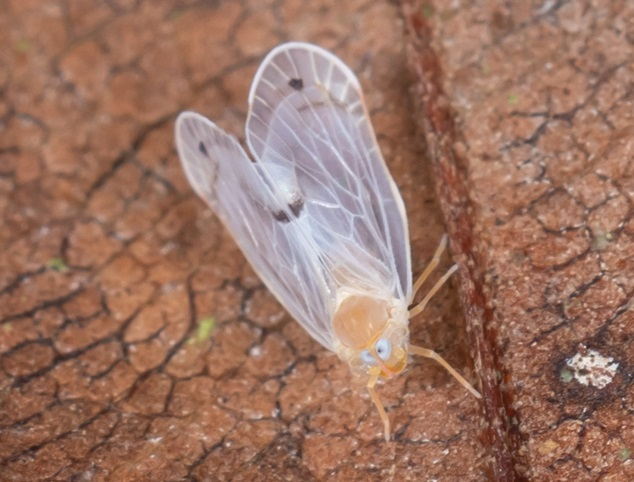
- Sumangala sp. from southern Sumatra, Indonesia, possibly Sumangala sufflava

Scientific classification
- Kingdom: Animalia
- Phylum: Arthropoda
- Clade: Pancrustacea
- Class: Insecta
- Order: Hemiptera
- Suborder: Auchenorrhyncha
- Infraorder: Fulgoromorpha
- Family: Derbidae
- Subfamily: Otiocerinae
- Tribe: Rhotanini
- Genus: Sumangala; Distant 1911

= Sumangala (planthopper) =

Genus of planthopper

Sumangala is a genus of planthoppers from the family Derbidae, tribe Rhotanini. The 13 species are found in southern Asia from southern India and Sri Lanka in the West over parts of mainland Asia (Myanmar, Malaysia, Thailand, Vietnam and southern China) to south-east Asian islands like Taiwan and the Philippines and including parts of Indonesia. The adult hoppers are around 5 mm long from head to the tip of the wings. They can be recognized by their forewing venation where a branch of cubitus anterior joins the initial media branch to form the basal median cell (see illustrations below), unlike in other genera of Rhotanini where the basal median cell is formed by a crossvein between the initial media branch and the cubitus branch (Alara, Dichotropis, Levu, Rhotana, Rhotanella) or by the initial branch of the media splitting again close to its base and the inner sub branch joining a cubitus branch (Muiralevu and Saccharodite). In Sumangala, the initial media branch does not split and as a consequence, only 6 veins of the cubitus-media complex reach the margin at the end of the wing. The forewings of Sumangala are mainly whitish and most of them lack larger black marks.

Type species: Sumangala delicatula Distant, 1911

== Distribution ==
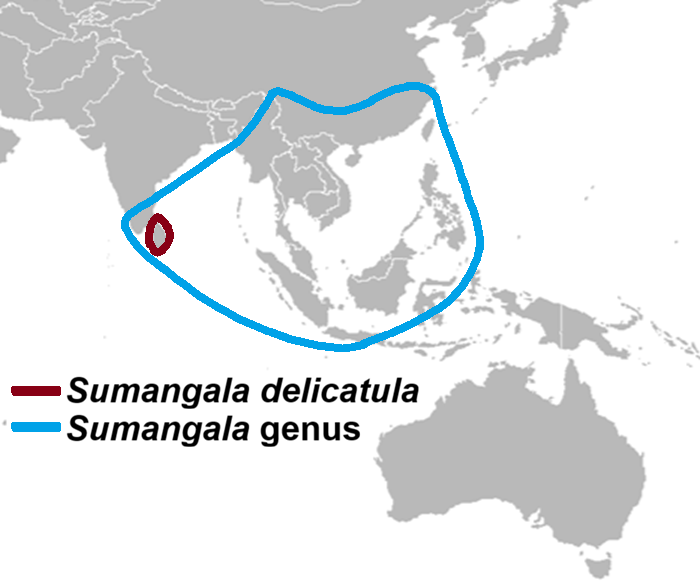
Distribution records for species in the genus Sumangala (blue outline) and those of Sumangala delicatula, the type species (brown outline)

The species of Sumangala are found in tropical parts of Asia, ranging from southern India and Sri Lanka in the West to Taiwan, southern China, the Philippines and parts of Indonesia in the East. On the Asian mainland, Sumangala species have been recorded from Myanmar, Thailand, Vietnam and West Malaysia, and in Indonesia from Sumatra, Borneo, Java and Sulawesi. Most species have a restricted geographical distribution. For example, the type species Sumangala delicatula has been only found in Sri Lanka. However, two species are more widely distributed, the first one is Sumangala sufflava the most common species in this genus which has a distribution range from Myanmar to southern China on mainland Asia and is also found in Taiwan, the Philippines and western parts of Indonesia, including Borneo, Sumatra and Java. The very similar sister species, Sumangala josephinae has a similar distribution in Thailand, the Philippines, Borneo, Sumatra and Sulawesi (Indonesia).

== Description ==
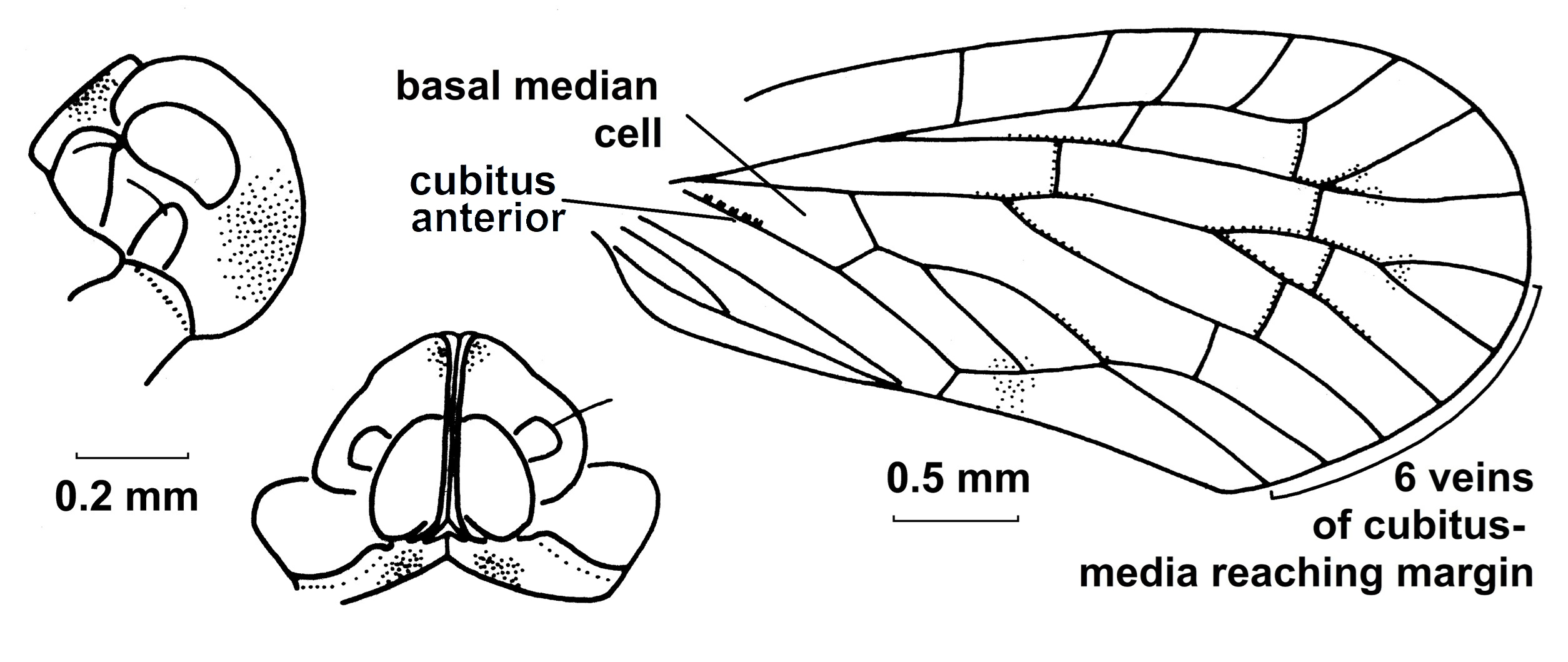
Head (profile and dorsal view) and forewing of Sumangala delicatula

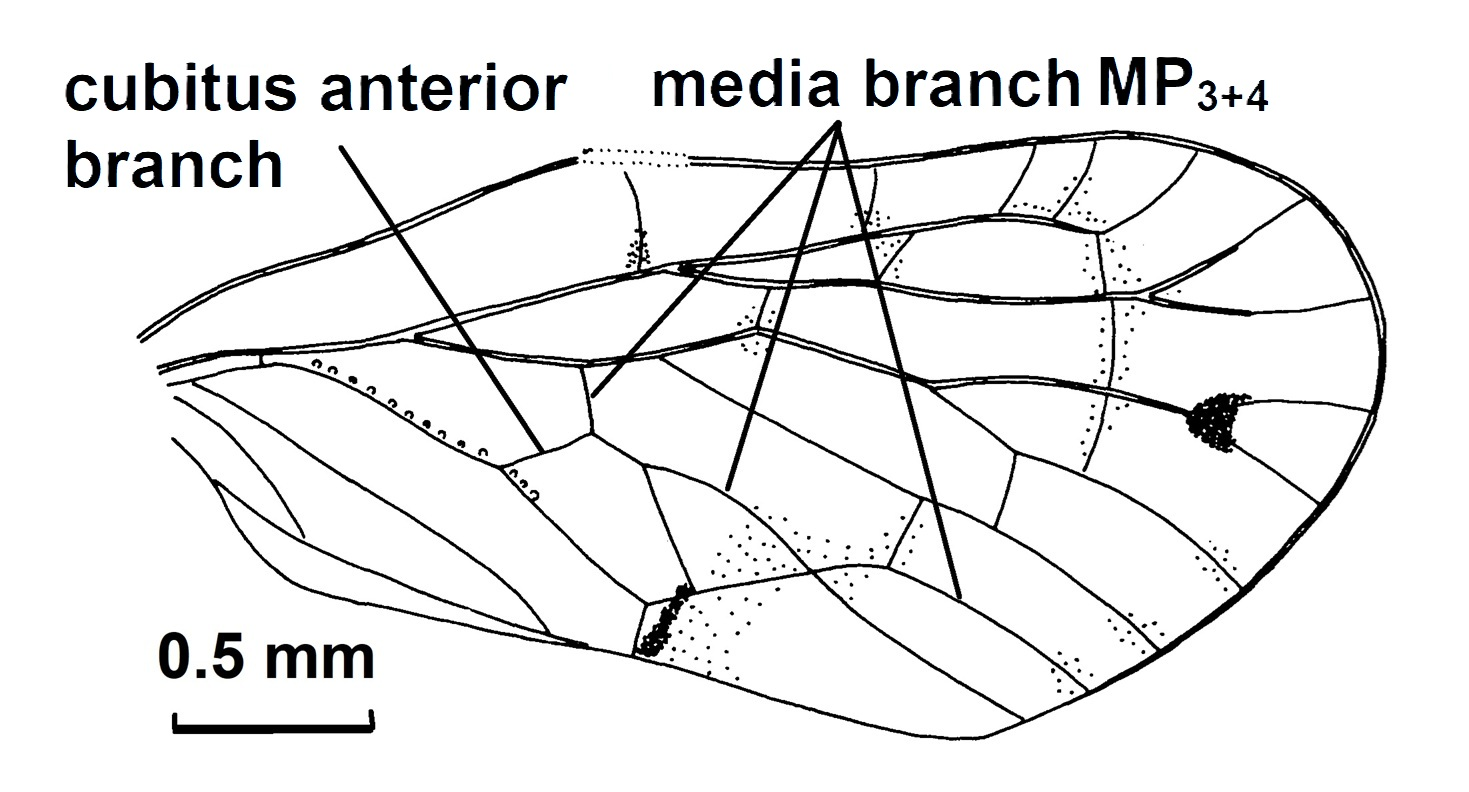
Sumangala josephinae

The main feature of the genus Sumangala is the forewing venation with a cubitus anterior branch joining the media most basal branch directly, forming a very simple and narrow basal median cell, see the illustrations on the left. In most other genera of Rhotanini, there is a crossvein connecting a cubitus anterior branch with the base of the media branch closest to its base, like in the genera Alara, Dichotropis, Levu, Rhotana and Rhotanella. In the two genera (Muiralevu and Saccharodite), the initial media branch splits again at its base and the inner sub-branch connects to a cubitus branch. In the genus Sumangala the basal media branch does not split into 2 sub branches like in all other genera of Rhotanini and as a consequence, only 6 veins (not 7) of the cubitus-media complex reach the margin at the end of the wing. The latter feature is only shared by the genus Saccharodite where a cubitus branch merges with the inner sub branch of the media branch closest to its base.

Other features of the genus Sumangala include the presence of 5 costal cells on the forewings and an evenly rounded profile of the head, with the ridges on the side of the face meeting in front of the eyes. The rostrum usually reaches the abdomen. The adult hoppers are around 5 mm long from head to the tip of the wings and carry their forewings in a roof-like position when the insects are at rest.

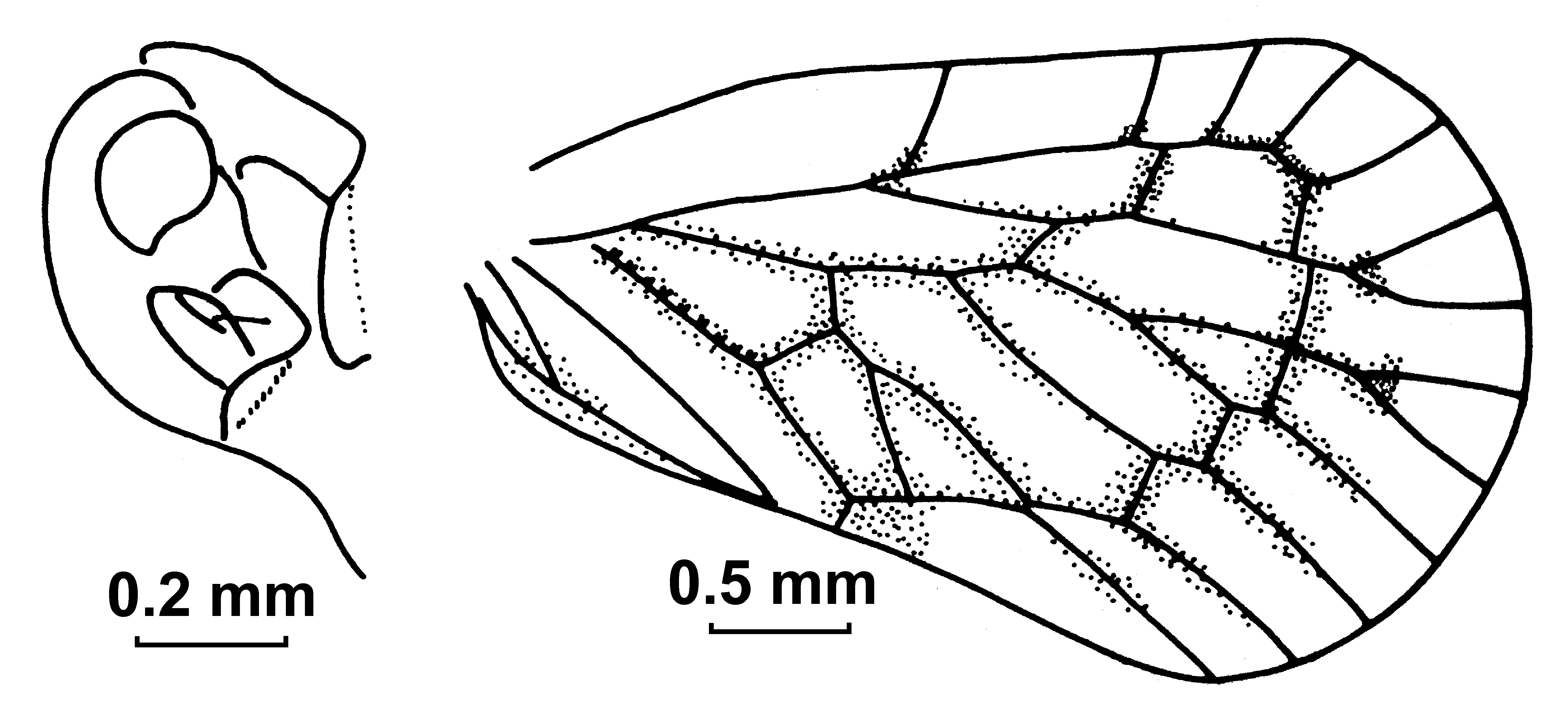
Head and forewing of Sumangala indica

The species of Sumangala typically have a straw-coloured body with some parts like the margins of the facial ridges being coloured orange, orange-red, light brown or reddish brown. The forewings are whitish and powdered, often with small black marks or with some brownish areas along some veins. Uncommon colour patterns include larger black marks on the forewings (Sumangala nigromaculata and Sumangala sordida) or most of the forewing veins accompanied by brownish areas like in Sumangala indica (see illustration at right). The forewing veins are usually colourless, but may have some orange sections. The hind wings are also usually colourless. However, one species, Sumangala nubila, has most of its forewing veins coloured orange, as well as bright red veins on the hind wings.

== Biology ==
Like in other genera of the Rhotanini, there is very little information on the biology of the species of Sumangala. It is assumed that, the nymphal stages live in decaying organic matter like other derbids, feeding on fungi. Information on the host plants that the adults feed on is scarce. Several species have been collected from coconut palms and one species from coffee bushes.

== Taxonomy and species ==
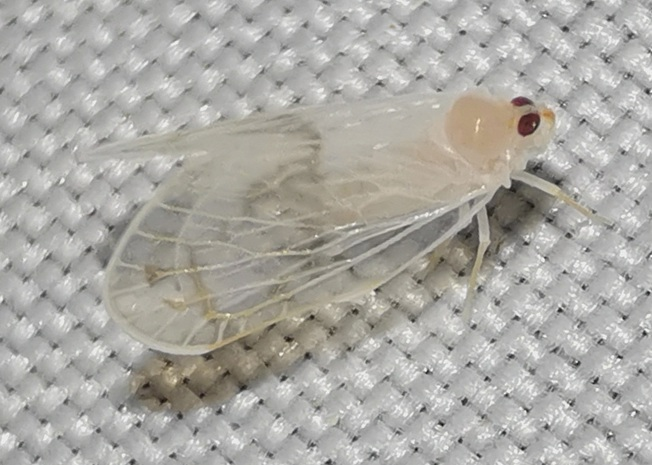
Sumangala sufflava from Thailand

Sumangala is a forgotten genus in the tribe Rhotanini, like Alara and Dichotropis, which have not been mentioned in the literature since their original description, until the whole tribe of the Rhotanini was revised in 1981, around 70 years later. In the meantime, species of Sumangala were described under various other genera. For example Sumangala sufflava (Muir, 1913) has been originally described as Levu sufflava and was later described again under the genera Rhotana and Mecynorhynchus (a synonym for Alara) as Rhotana hopponis Matsumura 1914 and Mecynorhynchus stramineus Muir 1914. However, the establishment of Sumangala as a separate genus is justified due to the unique forewing venation.

The following 13 species are recognized as of 2026. Basionyms are given in square brackets.

- Sumangala badia Zelazny 2011 (North Borneo, rare)
- Sumangala delicatula Distant 1911 (Sri Lanka, rare)
- Sumangala distanti Zelazny 2011 (northern Borneo, rare)
- Sumangala furcata Zelazny 1981 (northern Luzon, Philippines, and southern China, uncommon)
- Sumangala indica Zelazny 2011 (southern India, uncommon)
- Sumangala josephinae Zelazny 1981 (Philippines, western parts of Indonesia, Borneo and Thailand, often common)
- Sumangala nigromaculata Zelazny 1981 (Philippines, uncommon)
- Sumangala nigropunctata (Muir 1917) [Mecynorhynchus hyalinus Muir 1915 not Melichar] (Java, Indonesia, rare)
- Sumangala nubila Zelazny 2011 (North Borneo, uncommon)
- Sumangala otilanoi Zelazny 1981 (southern Luzon, Philippines, uncommon)
- Sumangala sordida Zelazny 1981 (Mindanao Isl., Philippines, uncommon)
- Sumangala sufflava (Muir 1913) [Levu sufflava] (Borneo Isl., western parts of Indonesia, mainland Malaysia, Myanmar, Thailand, Vietnam, southern China, Taiwan and Philippines, often common)
- Sumangala tenebrosa Zelazny 2011 (northern Borneo, rare)
