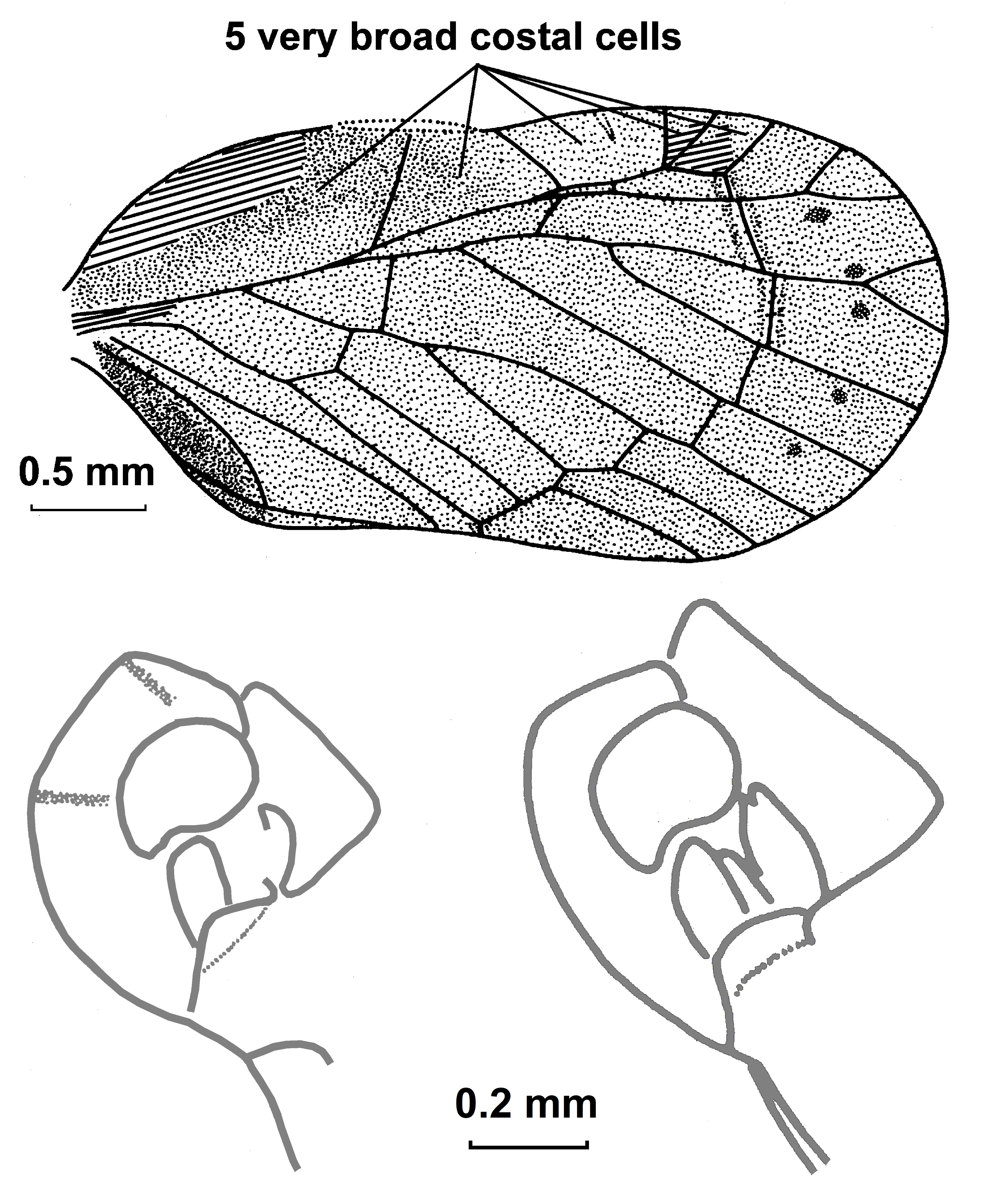
- Top: Rhotanella thyrsis forewing (the striped areas in the costal cells are bright red) - Bottom: profiles of Rhotanella bipunctata (left) and Rhotanella sophiae (right)

Scientific classification
- Kingdom: Animalia
- Phylum: Arthropoda
- Clade: Pancrustacea
- Class: Insecta
- Order: Hemiptera
- Suborder: Auchenorrhyncha
- Infraorder: Fulgoromorpha
- Family: Derbidae
- Subfamily: Otiocerinae
- Tribe: Rhotanini
- Genus: Rhotanella; Fennah 1970

= Rhotanella =

Genus of planthopper

Rhotanella is a small genus of planthoppers from the family Derbidae, tribe Rhotanini, with 8 species. The species are found in the Philippines, Indonesia, New Guinea, the Solomon Islands and southern China. The adult hoppers are between 4–6 mm long from head to the tip of the wings. They can be recognized by the shape and venation of their forewings which have a broad base and 5 very wide costal cells. Especially the first (basal) costal cell is very broad and has a width of about one quarter to one third of the width of the whole wing. The ridges on the sides of the face meet in front of the eyes. The profile of the head is also unusual for the tribe Rhotanini and has either an approximately rectangular or a somewhat triangular outline. The colour of the body is straw-coloured to light brown. The legs may be partly red or have red stripes. The forewings are brownish, but may have red marks in the costal cells. The forewings are carried in a roof-like position when the insects are at rest.

Type species: Rhotanella thyrsis Fennah, 1970

== Distribution ==
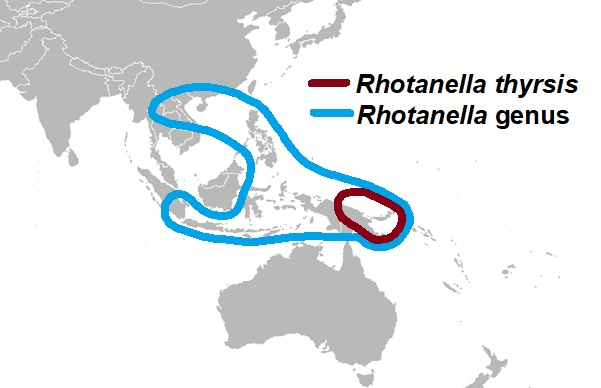
Published distribution records for species in the genus Rhotanella (blue outline) and those of Rhotanella thyrsis, the type species (brown outline)

The species of Rhotanella are found in south-eastern Asia, ranging from New Guinea and the Solomon Islands in the east to the Asian mainland in the west. The range includes the Philippines and most parts of Indonesia. Most species have a restricted distribution to a small geographic area. However, Rhotanella lucida (Muir, 1915) has a wider distribution. It was originally described from eastern parts of Java, but has been also reported from the Philippines, Sumatra and Sulawesi. The distribution range of R. lucida appears to be even larger, as there are images from Thailand on the internet.

== Description ==
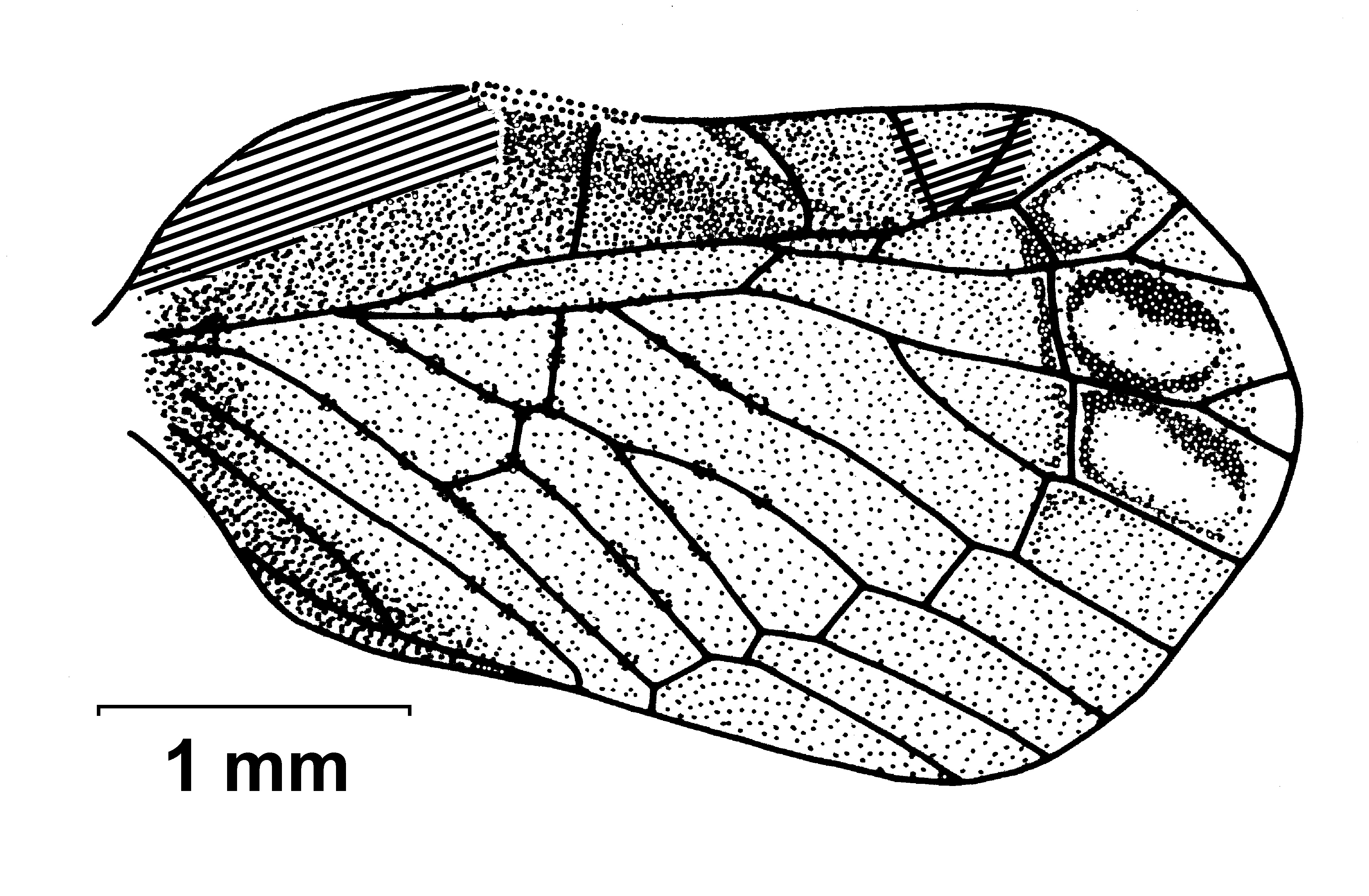
Rhotanella sophiae forewing, the striped areas in the costal cells are bright red

Among the tribe Rhotanini, the genus Rhotanella stands out by the shape and venation of its forewings. While in other species of Rhotanini the forewings are narrow at their base and widen towards the tip, the forewing base of Rhotanella species is very wide so that the anterior and hind margins of the wing are approximately parallel in most species. Especially the basal costal cell is extremely broad with a width between one quarter to one third of the width of the whole wing. The other costal cells are also very broad and have an unusual shape. The 2nd cell has a trapezoid shape and the 4th cell a triangular shape. The remaining forewing venation is similar to that found in the genera Alara, Dichotropis, Levu and Rhotana.

Other features of Rhotanella include a mostly brownish colour of the forewings, typically with many veins lined with white spots. In addition, the forewings can have large bright red areas and/or red veins. Parts of the veins of the hind wings may also be red. The head is angulated in profile, either with a triangular or an approximately rectangular outline. The ridges at the side of the face meet in front of the eyes. The rostrum is short and does not reach the hind coxae or just reaches them. The adult hoppers have a size between 4 and 6 mm from head to the end of the wings. The colour of the body is mainly light brown, but the legs often have red marks or red stripes. The forewings are carried in a roof-like position when the insects are at rest.

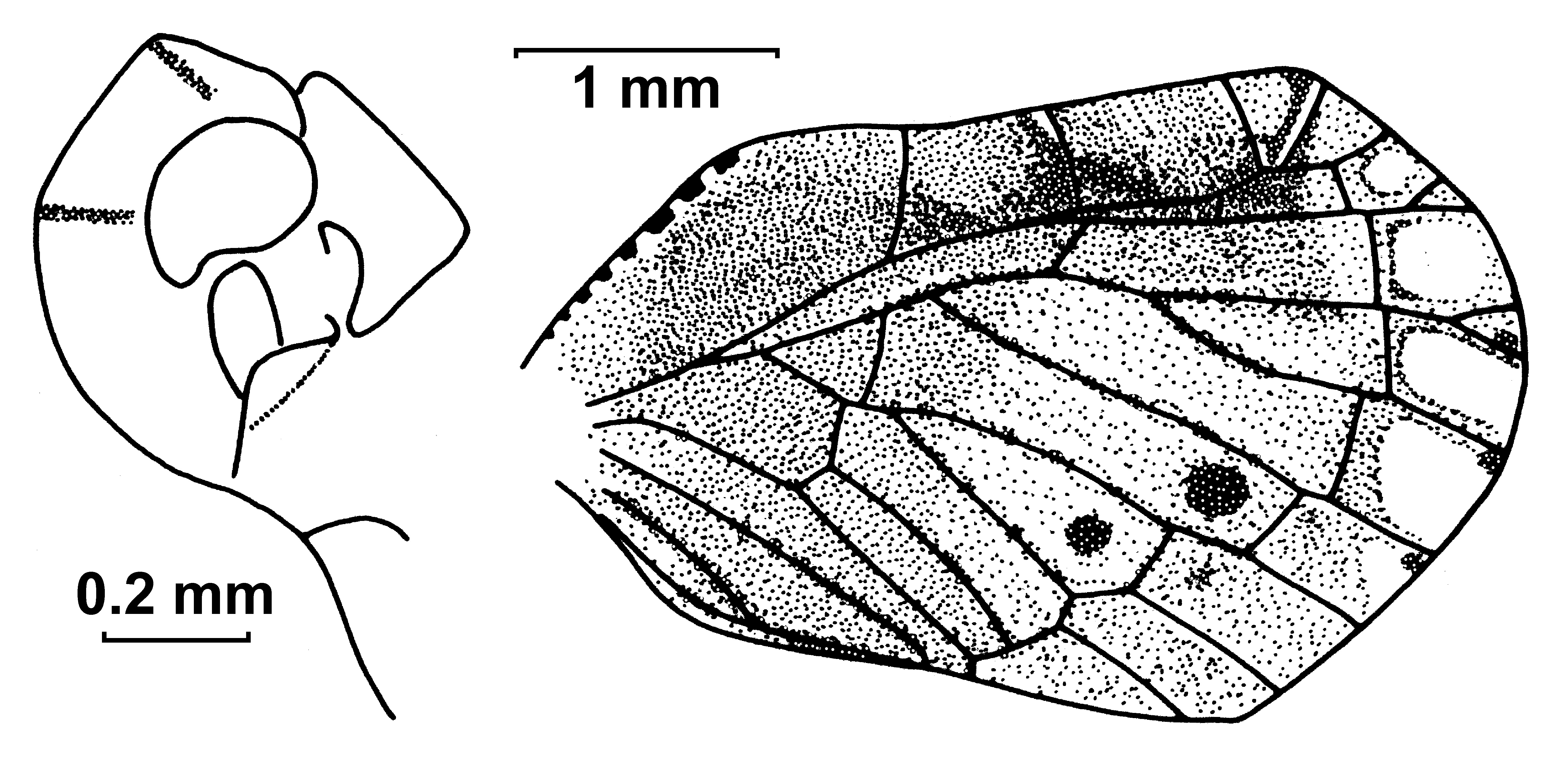
Rhotanella bipunctata head in profile and forewing

The species of Rhotanella can be divided into two distinct groups based on the profile of the head and several other features. The first group is called the Rhotanella bipunctata species group and is characterized by an approximately rectangular profile of the head. It includes 4 species (R. bipunctata, R. lautereri, R. novemmaculata and R. punctuvenosa) which are found in the Philippines, the island of Sulawesi (Indonesia) and southern China. Apart from the approximately rectangular outline of the head in profile, the forewings have a series of black marks on the costa near the wing base. The forewings lack any red marks.

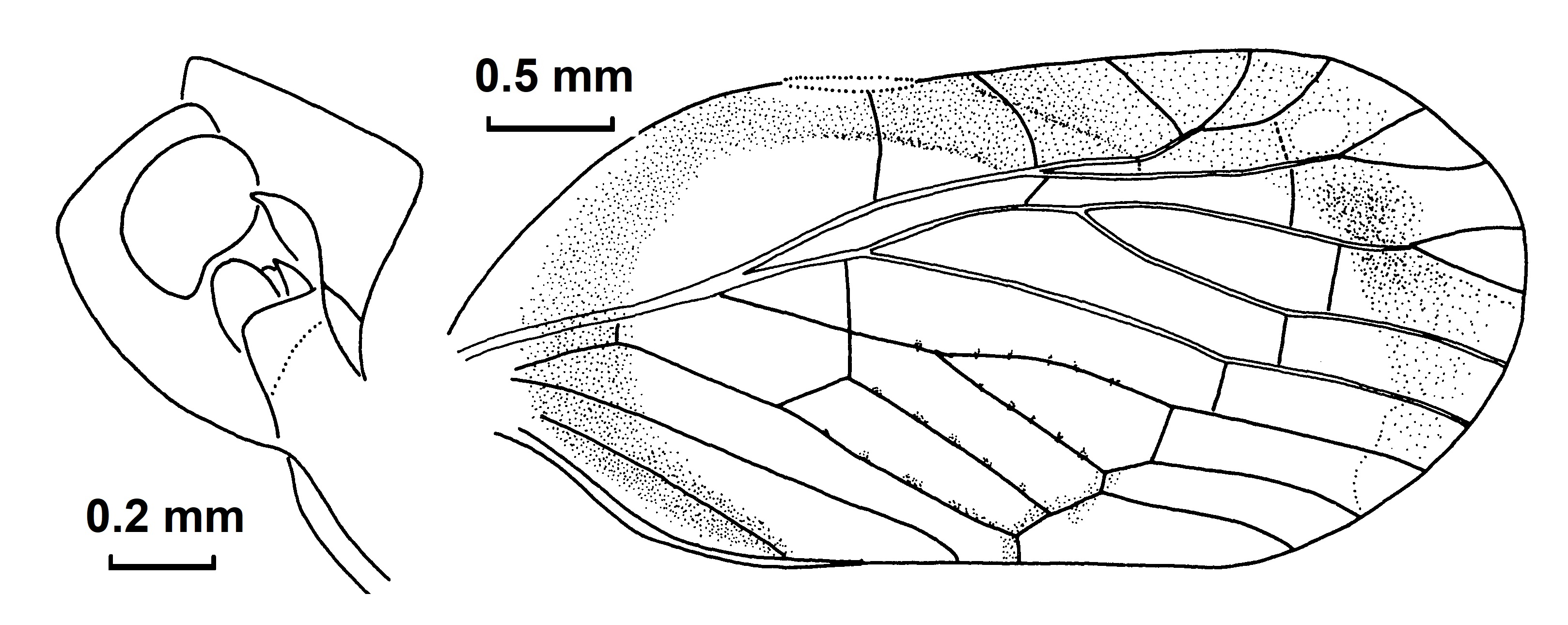
Rhotanella lucida head in profile and forewing

The second group, the Rhotanella thyrsis species group, includes the type species from New Guinea and the Solomon Islands, R. cyclops and R. sophiae, also from New Guinea, and R. lucida from the Philippines and Indonesia. These species have a triangular profile of the head, the forewings lack the series of black marks at the base of the costa, and except for R. lucida have bright red marks in the costal cells (the striped areas in the images of R. thyrsis and R. sophiae above). R. lucida is further unusual in that the forewings are not uniformly brown like in all other species of Rhotanella, but have a dark brown, ring-like band near the wing margins.

== Biology ==
Like in other genera of the Rhotanini, there is very little information on the biology of the species of Rhotanella. It is assumed that the nymphal stages live in decaying organic matter like other derbids, feeding on fungi. Information on the host plants the adults feed on is scarce. Several species have been collected from palms, mainly coconut palms.

== Taxonomy and species ==
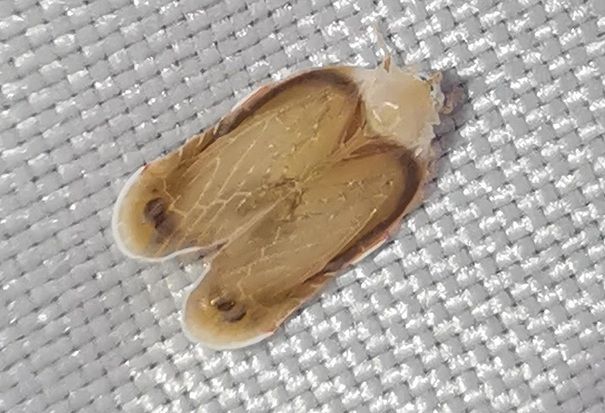
Rhotanella lucida from Thailand

Two species of Rhotanella (R. lucida and R. punctovenosa) had been already described under the genera Rhotana and Levu before Fennah's description of the genus. R. punctovenosa had been even described twice, as Rhotana punctovenosa by Melichar and as Levu irrorata by Muir. Taken the unusual forewing shape, venation and colouration, the separation of Rhotanella from Rhotana and Levu seems to be fully justified.

The following 8 species are recognized as of 2026. Basionyms are given in square brackets.

Rhotanella bipunctata species group:

- Rhotanella bipunctata Zelazny 2011 (Central Sulawesi, Indonesia, uncommon)
- Rhotanella lautereri Zelazny 1981 (southern Luzon, Philippines, uncommon)
- Rhotanella novemmacula Wang, Chou & Yuan, 1993 (south-western China, uncommon)
- Rhotanella punctovenosa (Melichar 1915) [Rhotana punctovenosa] (Philippines, uncommon)

Rhotanella thyrsis species group:

- Rhotanella cyclops Zelazny 2011 (New Guinea, uncommon)
- Rhotanella lucida (Muir 1915) [Levu lucida] (Indonesia, Philippines, Thailand, uncommon)
- Rhotanella sophiae Zelazny 2011 (Papua New Guinea, rare)
- Rhotanella thyrsis Fennah 1970 (Papua New Guinea and Solomon Isl., uncommon)
