= List of Rhotana species =

The following species in the insect genus Rhotana (family Derbidae, tribe Rhotanini) are recognized as of 2026. Basionyms are given in square brackets.

- Rhotana aequa Zelazny 2011 (Papua New Guinea, rare)
- Rhotana albata Melichar 1903 (Sri Lanka, rare)
- Rhotana aperta Zelazny 2011 (northern Borneo, Malaysia and Hainan Isl., China, uncommon)
- Rhotana argus Zelazny 2011 (Sulawesi, rare)
- Rhotana biermani (Schmidt 1926) [Decora biermani] (Buru Isl., Indonesia, rare)
- Rhotana bimaculata Chen & Zhang 2026 (Yunnan Prov., southern China, can be moderately common)
- Rhotana brendelli Zelazny 2011 (Sulawesi, rare)
- Rhotana concolor Zelazny 1981 (southern Philippines and Borneo, uncommon)
- Rhotana crassa Zelazny 2011 (North Borneo, rare)
- Rhotana cribraria Zelazny 2011 (North Borneo, uncommon)
- Rhotana dammermani (Schmidt 1926) [Decora dammermani] (Buru Isl., Indonesia, rare)
- Rhotana deminuta Zelazny 2011 (New Caledonia, uncommon)
- Rhotana dentata Zelazny 2011 (New Guinea, rare)
- Rhotana dextra Zelazny 2011 (New Britain, Papua New Guinea, uncommon)
- Rhotana dohertyi Zelazny 2011 (north-eastern India, uncommon)
- Rhotana excelsa Melichar 1914 (Philippines, moderately common)
- Rhotana fera Zelazny 2011 (North Borneo, rare)
- Rhotana fordi Zelazny 2011 (Papua New Guinea, rare)
- Rhotana formosana Matsumura 1914 (Taiwan, Shaanxi and Fujian provinces on mainland China mainland, Vietnam, uncommon)
- Rhotana fuscofasciata Distant 1906 (Sri Lanka, rare)
- Rhotana globosa Zelazny 2011 (western New Guinea, rare)
- Rhotana gracilis Zelazny 2011 (New Guinea, rare)
- Rhotana gressittorum Zelazny 2011 (eastern Australia, uncommon)
- Rhotana grisea Chen & Zhang 2026 (Fujian Prov., southern China, uncommon)
- Rhotana haematoneura Kirkaldy 1906 (north-eastern Australia, rare)
- Rhotana hirashimai Zelazny 2011 (North Borneo, uncommon)
- Rhotana holtmanni Zelazny 2011 (North Borneo, rare)
- Rhotana inoptata Yang & Wu 1993 (Yunnan Prov., China, Taiwan, uncommon)
- Rhotana inorata Yang & Wu 1993 (Taiwan, uncommon)
- Rhotana jacobsoni Zelazny 2011 (Sumatra, West Malaysia, Hainan and Fujian Provinces in southern China, uncommon)
- Rhotana kuncheriai Zelazny 2011 (North Borneo and West Malaysia, uncommon)
- Rhotana lalage (Fennah 1969) [Decora lalage] (New Caledonia, rare)
- Rhotana latipennis Walker 1857 (North Borneo, rare)
- Rhotana luteola Zelazny 2011 (New Ireland, Papua New Guinea, rare)
- Rhotana maculata Matsumura 1914 (Taiwan, eastern China, southern Japan, uncommon)
- Rhotana magna Zelazny 2011 (North Borneo, rare)
- Rhotana marmorata Zelazny 1981 (southern Philippines, Borneo, Sumatra, Sulawesi, Singapore, West Malaysia, moderately common)
- Rhotana melichari Zelazny 2011 (New Guinea Isl., uncommon)
- Rhotana mendax Zelazny 2011 (north-eastern Australia, rare)
- Rhotana miles Zelazny 2011 (North Borneo, Palawan Isl., Philippines, uncommon)
- Rhotana mindanaoensis Zelazny 1981 (Mindanao Isl., Philippines, uncommon)
- Rhotana novahiberniensis Zelazny 2011 (New Ireland, Papua New Guinea, rare)
- Rhotana nubilimacula Chen & Zhang 2026 (Fujian Prov., southern China, rare)
- Rhotana obaerata Yang & Wu 1993 (Hainan Isl., China, Taiwan, uncommon)
- Rhotana ornata Zelazny 1981 (Mindanao Isl., Philippines, uncommon)
- Rhotana pacata Zelazny 2011 (North Borneo, uncommon)
- Rhotana panthera Zelazny 2011 (Papua New Guinea, rare)
- Rhotana papuensis Zelazny 2011 (Papua New Guinea, rare)
- Rhotana paratruncata Chen & Zhang 2026 (Fujian, Jiangxi, Zhejiang, Anhui Provinces, China, uncommon)
- Rhotana pavo (Bierman 1910) [Decora pavo] (Sumatra, Borneo, uncommon)
- Rhotana pellax Fennah 1967 (Samoa, rare)
- Rhotana quadrimaculata Distant 1907 (Queensland, Australia, uncommon)
- Rhotana qinlingensis Chen & Zhang 2026 (Shaanxi Province, China, uncommon)
- Rhotana ramentosa Distant 1907 (Queensland, Australia, uncommon)
- Rhotana ramosa Zelazny 2011 (Sumatra, Indonesia, uncommon)
- Rhotana reticulata Zelazny 2011 (North Borneo, rare)
- Rhotana rubifasciata Zelazny 2011 (New Ireland, Papua New Guinea, rare)
- Rhotana ruficlypea Chen & Zhang 2026 (Hainan Isl. and Guangxi Province, China, rare)
- Rhotana sabaea Zelazny 2011 (North Borneo, rare)
- Rhotana satsumana Matsumura 1914 (southern Japan, China, Taiwan, uncommon)
- Rhotana sectator Zelazny 2011 (Papua New Guinea, uncommon)
- Rhotana semiopalina Muir 1926 (Borneo, Java, Mentawai Isl., moderately common)
- Rhotana septemmaculata Distant 1907 (Queensland, Australia, rare)
- Rhotana shuimoa Chen & Zhang 2026 (Hainan Isl. and Yunnan Province, China, uncommon)
- Rhotana similis Zelazny 2011 (western New Guinea, rare)
- Rhotana spenceri Zelazny 2011 (Vietnam, south-western China, rare)
- Rhotana stali Zelazny 2011 (Sri Lanka, rare)
- Rhotana stigmosa Zelazny 1981 (Luzon Isl., Philippines, rare)
- Rhotana suttoni Zelazny 2011 (North Borneo, Brunei, rare)
- Rhotana torrevillasi Zelazny 1981 (Mindanao Isl., Philippines, uncommon)
- Rhotana transversolinea Melichar 1914 (Java, Mentawai Isl., Borneo, West Malaysia, uncommon)
- Rhotana tridentata Zelazny 2011 (North Borneo, West Malaysia, south-western China, uncommon)
- Rhotana trimaculata Distant 1906 (Sri Lanka, rare)
- Rhotana triplex Zelazny 2011 (New Guinea, Biak Isl., rare)
- Rhotana truncata Zelazny 2011 (North Borneo, rare)
- Rhotana unca Zelazny 2011 (Papua New Guinea, uncommon)
- Rhotana venosa Distant 1906 (Myanmar, West Malaysia, Laos, Vietnam, Borneo, Verlaten Isl. in Indonesia, common)
- Rhotana vitriceps (Stål 1858) [Genestia vitriceps] (Sri Lanka, uncommon)
- Rhotana wallacei Zelazny 2011 (North Sulawesi, Indonesia, rare)
- Rhotana wuyiensis Chen & Zhang 2026 (Fujian, southern China, rare)
