= List of Muiralevu species =

Genus of planthoppers

The following species in the insect genus Muiralevu (family Derbidae, tribe Rhotanini) are recognized as of 2026. Basionyms are given in square brackets.

- Muiralevu africanus (Muir 1926) [Levu africana] (West Africa including Sierra Leone, Central African Republic, Cameroon, Ivory Coast and Nigeria, uncommon)
- Muiralevu cavernae Zelazny 2011 (North Borneo, rare)
- Muiralevu coniunctus Zelazny 2011 (North Borneo, rare)
- Muiralevu curvispinosus Van Stalle 1983 (Central African Republic and Nigeria, uncommon)
- Muiralevu dimidius Zelazny 2011 (mainland West Malaysia, rare)
- Muiralevu exotivus (Yang & Wu 1993) [Formolevu exotivus] (Taiwan, uncommon)
- Muiralevu ignavus Zelazny 2011 (mainland West Malaysia, rare)
- Muiralevu inermis Van Stalle 1983 (Cameroon, Nigeria and Congo, uncommon)
- Muiralevu maestus Zelazny 2011 (mainland West Malaysia, rare)
- Muiralevu medleri Zelazny 2011 (Nigeria, rare)
- Muiralevu parvus Zelazny 2011 (North Borneo and Hainan Isl., China, uncommon)
- Muiralevu philippinensis Zelazny 1981 (southern Philippines, rare)
- Muiralevu quadramaculatus (Muir, 1915) [Levu quadramaculata] (Taiwan, uncommon)
- Muiralevu reticulatus Zelazny 2011 (West Malaysia, rare)
- Muiralevu rufomarginatus Zelazny 2011 (North Borneo, rare)
- Muiralevu septemspinosus Zelazny 2011 (Nigeria and Ivory Coast, rare)
- Muiralevu silvestris Zelazny 2011 (North Borneo, rare)
- Muiralevu telum Zelazny 2011 (West Malaysia, rare)
- Muiralevu vetus Zelazny 2011 (Java, Indonesia, rare)
