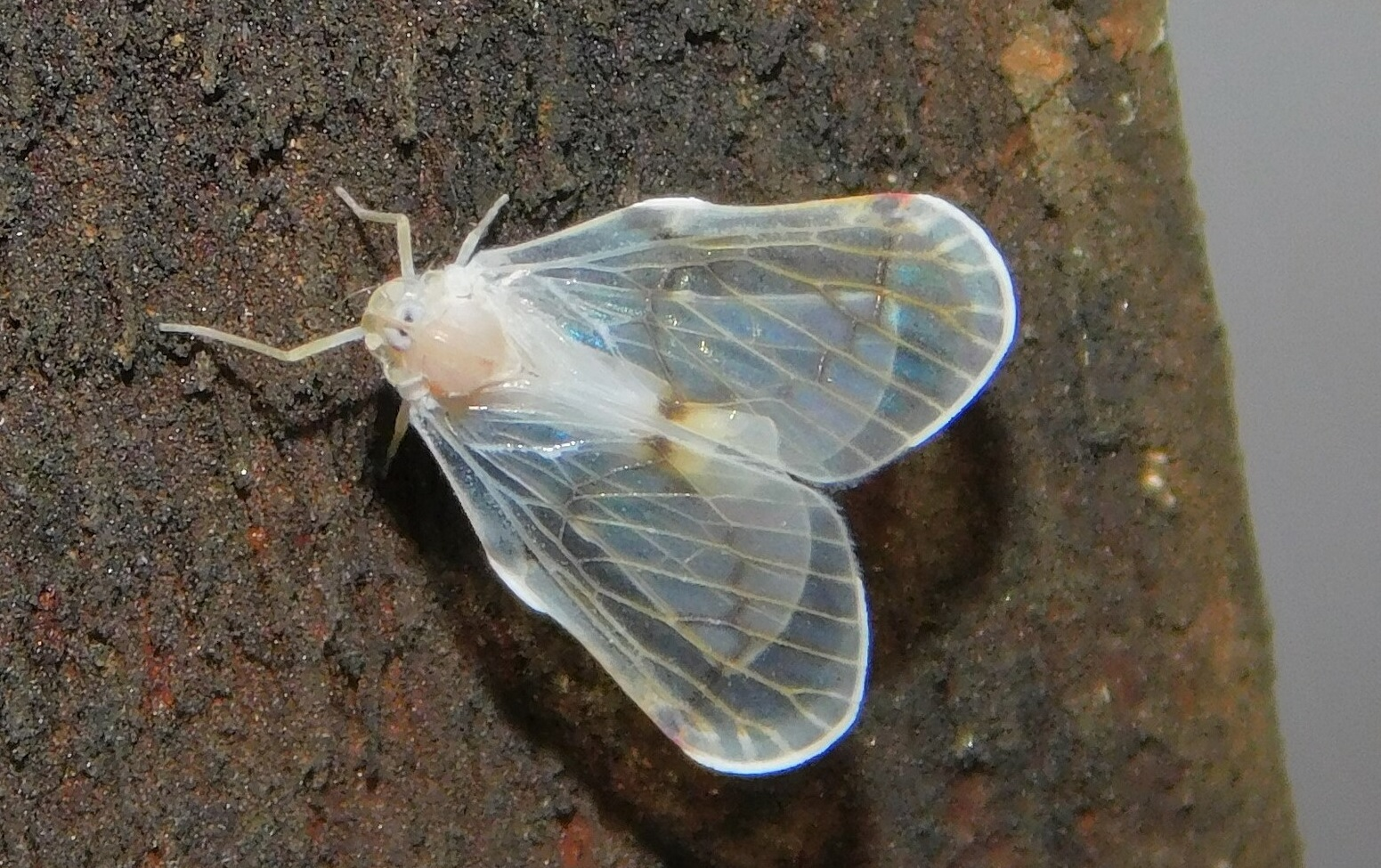
- a species of Muiralevu from Uganda

Scientific classification
- Kingdom: Animalia
- Phylum: Arthropoda
- Clade: Pancrustacea
- Class: Insecta
- Order: Hemiptera
- Suborder: Auchenorrhyncha
- Infraorder: Fulgoromorpha
- Family: Derbidae
- Subfamily: Otiocerinae
- Tribe: Rhotanini
- Genus: Muiralevu; Zelazny, 1981

Synonyms
- Formolevu Yang & Wu, 1993

= Muiralevu =

Genus of planthopper

Muiralevu is a genus of planthoppers from the family Derbidae, tribe Rhotanini, with 19 species. While the species of all other genera in the tribe Rhotanini are only found in southern Asia and the Pacific, the species of Muiralevu also occur in western Africa. The distribution of the type species covers several West African countries, ranging from Sierra Leone to the Central African Republic. Four other, very similar species are also found in western Africa, while 14 other species occur in south-eastern Asia (Taiwan, southern China, Malaysia, as well as parts of Indonesia and the Philippines). The species of Muiralevu can be recognized by their forewing venation, especially the 4 costal cells and the venation around the basal median cell. Apart from the basal median cell, there is also a characteristic trapezoid cell at the base of the first media branch. On average, the forewings are more elongated compared to most other species of Rhotanini. The adult hoppers are between 4 and 6 mm long from head to the tip of the wings. The head is evenly rounded and the ridges on the sides of the face meet in front of the eyes. The body is usually straw-coloured to light brown. The forewings are mostly whitish and powdered, but in a few species they have large black marks.

Type species: Levu africana Muir, 1926

== Distribution ==
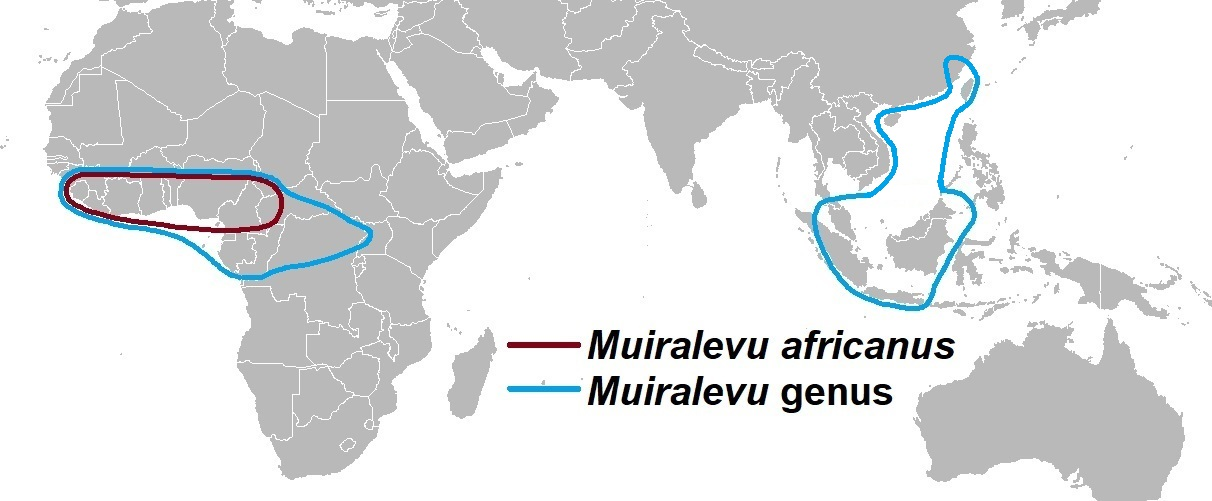
Distribution range of the genus Muiralevu (blue outlines) and that of Muiralevu africanus, the type species (brown outline)

Species of Muiralevu are found in most parts of tropical West Africa. The type species, Muiralevu africanus (originally described as Levu africana Muir, 1926) has a distribution range from Sierra Leone, over the Ivory Coast, Nigeria and Cameroon to the Central African Republic. Other African species of Muiralevu have similar distribution records, but have been also described as far south as Kinshasa in the Democratic Republic of Congo. In south-eastern Asia, two species have been described from Taiwan and assigned to the genus Formolevu, a synonym of Muiralevu. Further, the distribution of Muiralevu species includes southern mainland China (2 species), West Malaysia (5 species), Borneo (5 species) and one species each from Java and the southern tip of the Philippines (Basilan Island).

== Description ==
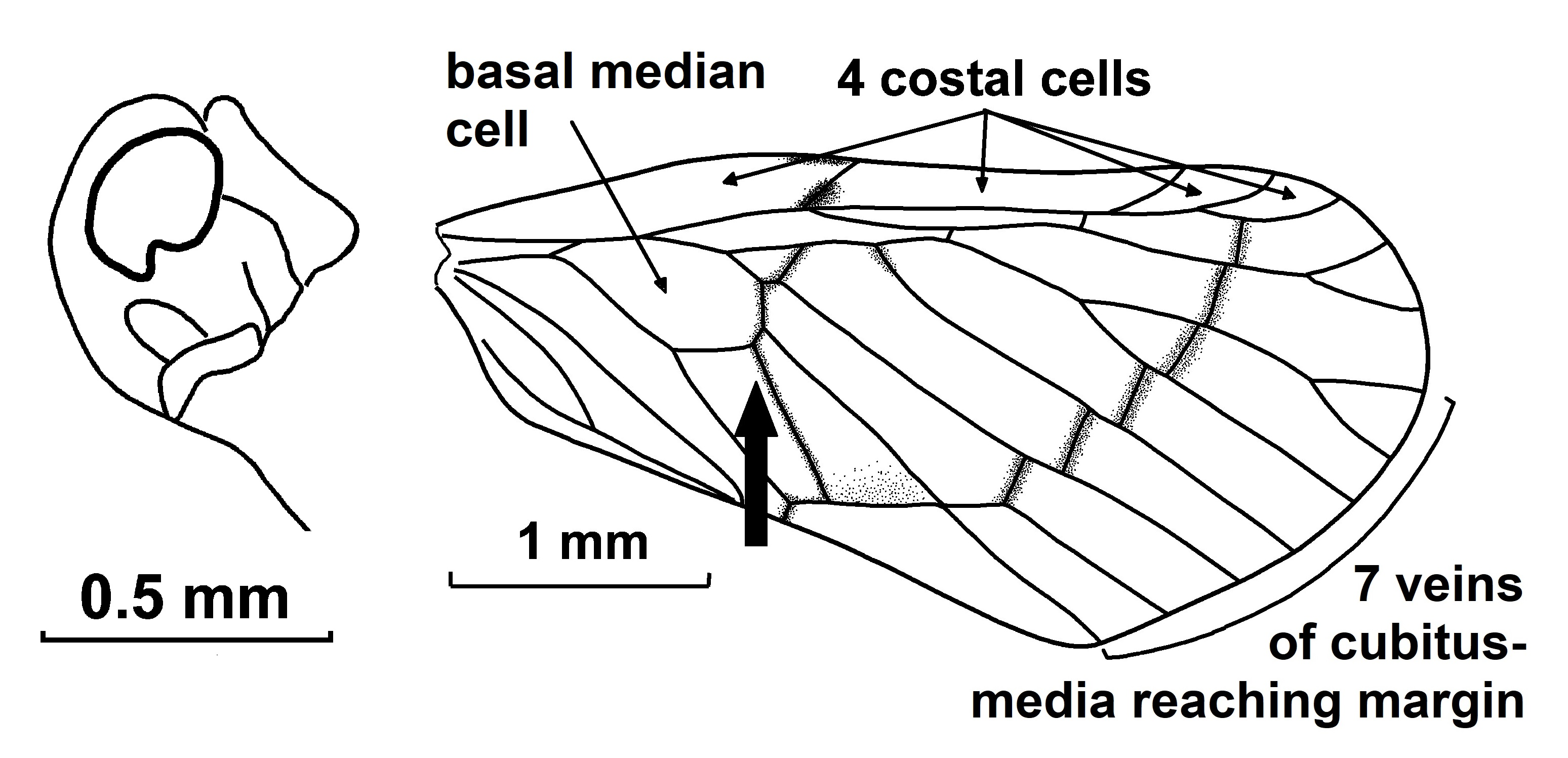
Muiralevu africanus - Left: head in profile, Right: forewing showing 4 costal cells, the characteristic venation around the basal median cell and the 7 veins of the cubitus-media complex reaching the margin at the end of the wing.

Like in other genera of Rhotanini, the species of Muiralevu can be most reliably recognized by the venation of their forewings. The venation is most similar to that in the genus Saccharodite. In both genera there are only 4 costal cells (see the image in the taxobox on the top right), but 5 in all other genera of Rhotanini. However, the venation around the basal median cell is different in both genera. In Saccharodite, the basal branch of the media splits close to its base and the inner sub branch joins a branch of the cubitus anterior to form the basal median cell. In Muiralevu the first media branch also splits close to its base in some species, including the type species. However, in those cases, the inner sub branch does not join a cubitus branch, but connects to it by a crossvein and unlike in Saccharodite, the 2 sub branches of the basal media branch reach the wing margin separately. This means in Muiralevu 7 veins of the cubitus-media complex reach the margin at the end of the wing (see the image in the taxobox on the top right) like in most other genera of Rhotanini, with the exception of species of Saccharodite and Sumangala.

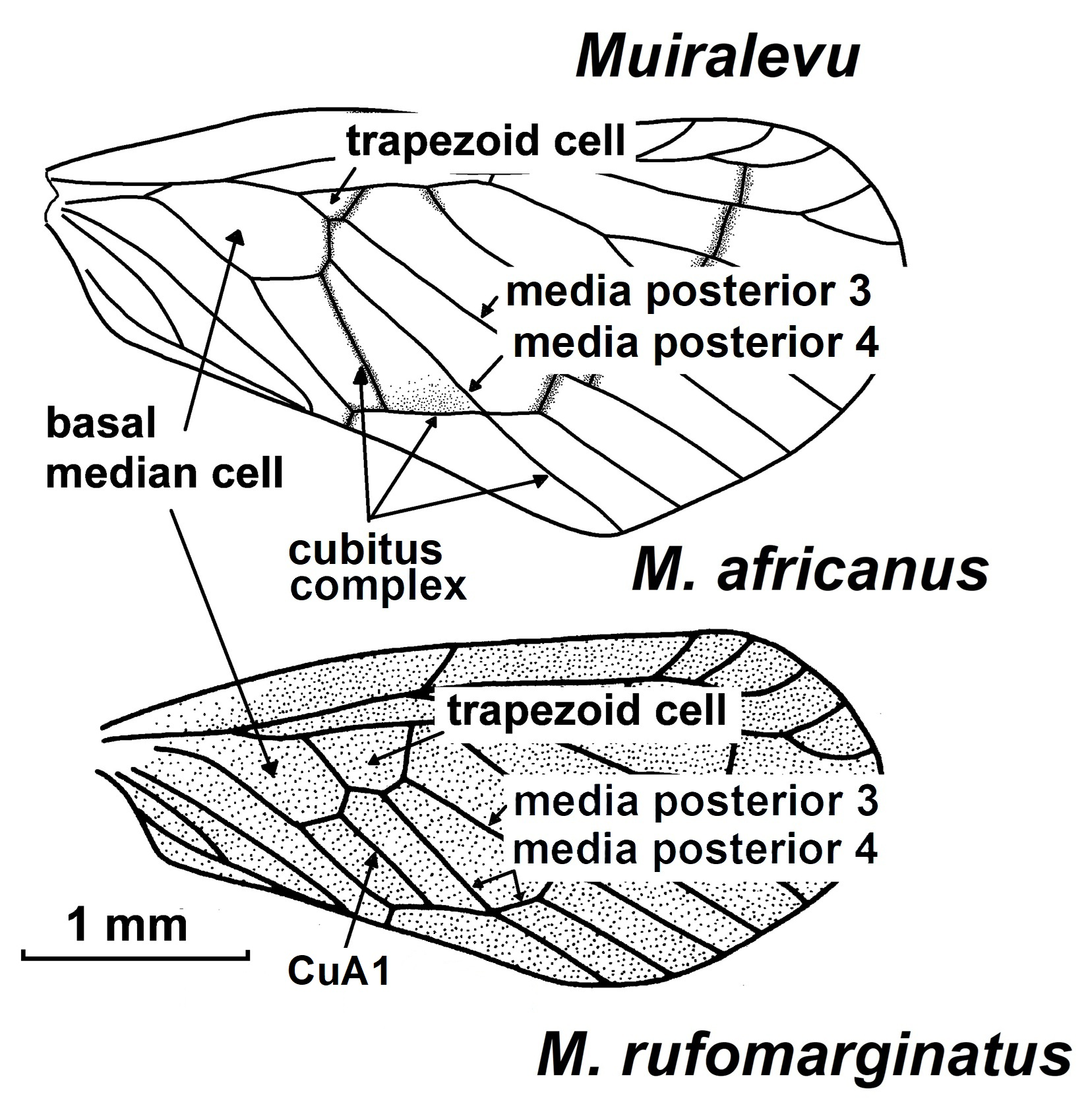
Details of forewing venation of Muiralevu africanus (top) and Muiralevu rufomarginatus (bottom) showing the basal median cell, the trapezoid cell and the course of the cubitus anterior branch and the 2 sub branches of the basal median branch (media posterior 3 and 4)

The illustration on the left shows the course of the cubitus anterior branch and that of the 2 sub branches of the basal media branch (media posterior 3 and 4) for 2 species of Muiralevu, the type species Muiralevu africanus on the top and Muiralevu rufomarginatus at the bottom. While the upper venation is found in all African species of this genus, the lower venation is found in most Asian species of the genus. In the latter case, the basal media branch does not split into 2 sub branches close to its base, but some distance from the basal median cell. The illustration at the left also shows a characteristic trapezoid cell formed by a crossvein between the outer sub branch of the first media branch and the media. All Muiralevu species have such a trapezoid cell, but such a cell is also occasionally found in other genera of Rhotanini. On average, the forewings in Muiralevu are more elongated than in Saccharodite and in most other species of Rhotanini, usually more than 2 times longer than wide. On the forewings of Muiralevu, the subcosta and radius separate near the end of first costal cell, but around the middle of the 2nd costal cell in most species of Saccharodite. In addition, most species of Muiralevu show an unusual venation on the hind wings with a branched tip of the radius. The forewings of many species are not glassy like in most species of Saccharodite.

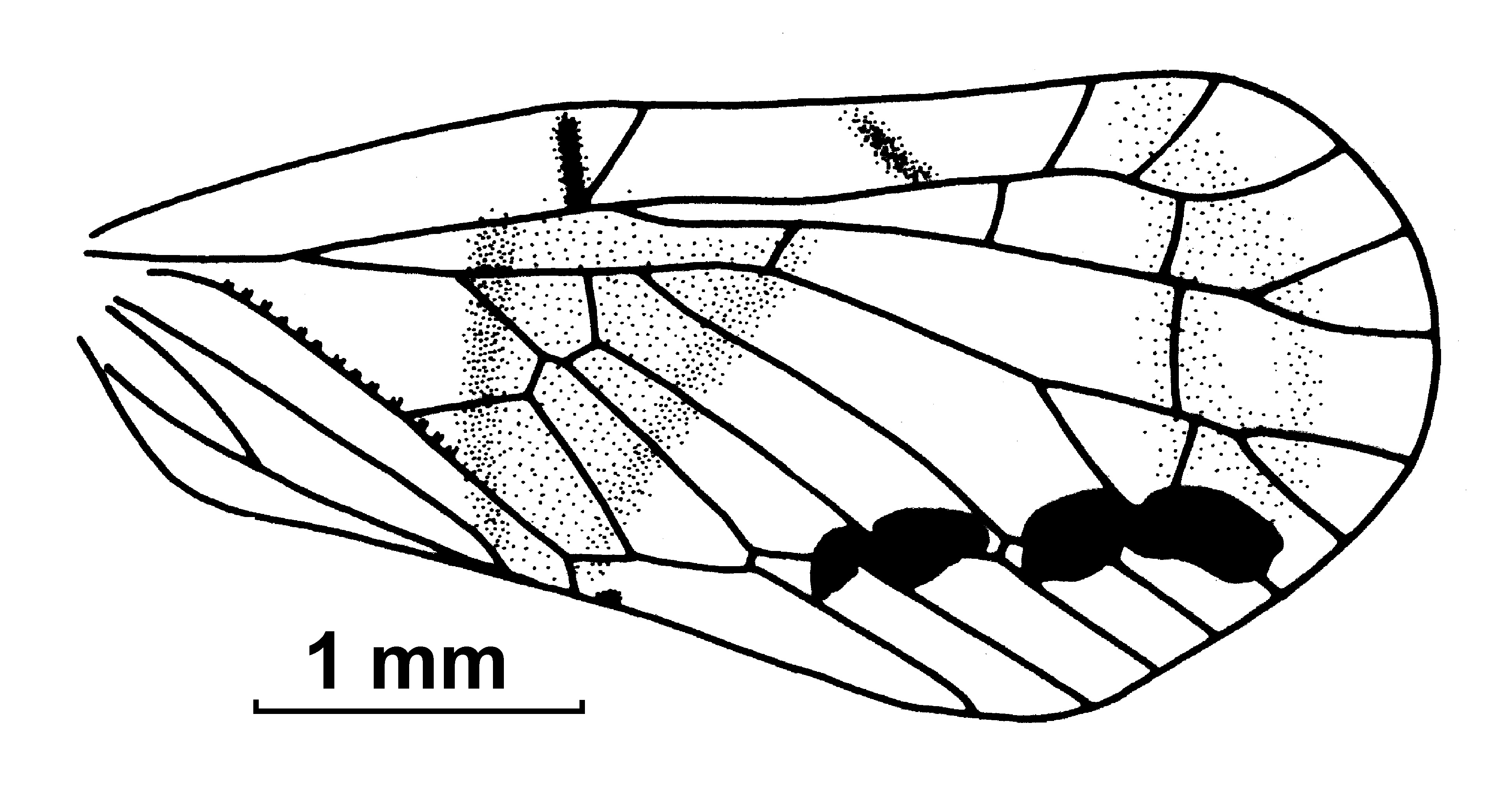
Forewing marks in Muiralevu quadramaculatus

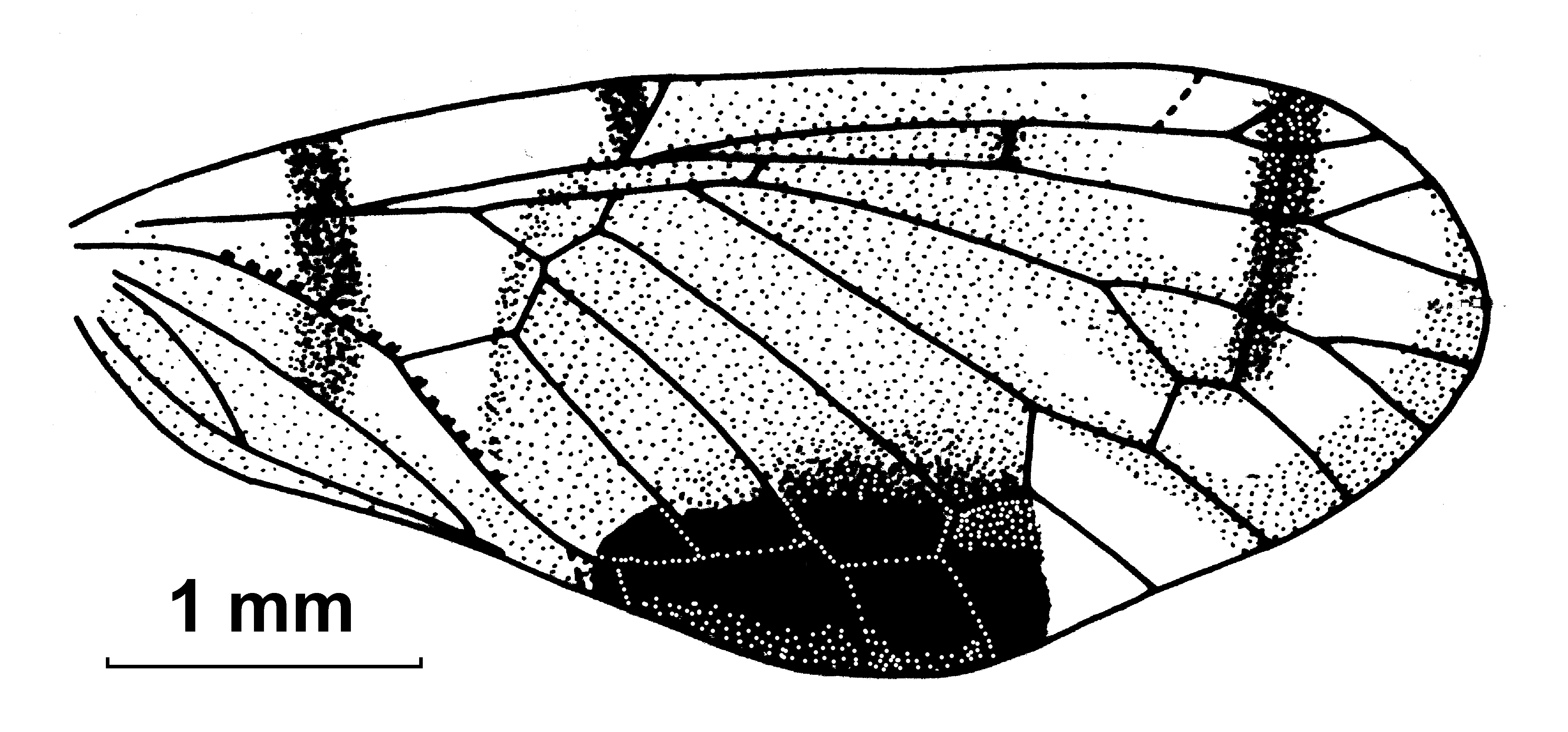
Forewing marks in Muiralevu coniunctus

Other features of the genus Muiralevu include an evenly rounded profile of the head with the ridges on the side of the face meeting in front of the eyes. The adult hoppers are between 4 and 6 mm long from head to the tip of the wings. The body of the species is in general straw-coloured, lacking bright red parts and marks. The margins of the facial ridges may be slightly orange or orange-brown, and in some species they are brightly orange or orange-red. The forewings of most species are whitish and powdered. However, in some species they are brownish or there is a series of prominent black marks near the hind margin which may be fused to a large black area (see illustrations on the right).

== Biology ==
Like in other genera of the Rhotanini, there is very little information on the biology of the species of Muiralevu. It is assumed that the nymphal stages live in decaying organic matter like other derbids, feeding on fungi. Information on the host plants the adults feed on is scarce. Some species have been collected from bamboo and Alpinia species.

== Taxonomy ==
Morphologically, the genus Muiralevu is most similar to the genus Saccharodite. In fact, in a few species, the forewing shape and venation approaches that of species from the Saccharodite matsumurae species group, e.g. that of Saccharodite perlucida and Saccharodite propinqua from Borneo. However, these 2 Saccharodite species have glassy forewings with the subcosta-radius fork close to the middle of the forewing and red marks on the legs, all features not found in Muiralevu species.

== Species and species groups ==
Of the 19 species described so far (as of 2026), 13 have been assigned to one of the following 3 species groups:

- The Muiralevu africanus species group includes the 5 African species of Muiralevu. They are characterized by the basal media branch on the forewing splitting close to its base and the inner sub branch forming part of the basal median cell. The trapezoid cell at the base of the first media branch is small and the forewings are mainly colourless with only a small dark mark at the end of the first costal cell and some brown areas accompanying some veins. See illustrations in the taxobox on the top right and at the beginning of this section.
- The Muiralevu dimidius species group includes 6 species found in West Malaysia, Borneo and southern China. They are characterized by the first media branch splitting at or after the end of the basal median cell and by a large trapezoid cell at the base of the first media branch, see the illustration of Muiralevu rufomarginatus (a member of this group) at the beginning of this section. The species of this group also have a black mark at the fork of the last media branch.
- The Muiralevu quadramaculatus species group includes 2 species found in Taiwan. They are characterized by a series of 4 prominent black marks near the hind margin of the forewings, around the apical crossveins between the media branches, see the illustration on the right. In the genus Muiralevu, these crossveins usually form a curved line, but in this group they are more aligned along a straight line which has been described as a character of the separate genus Formolevu. However, Formolevu is currently regarded as a synonym of Muiralevu.

Like for other genera in the tribe Rhotanini, most species are uncommon or rare. The most common and most widespread species is Muiralevu africanus (Muir 1926) which was originally described from the Sierra Leone, but is widely distributed in western Africa. For all Muiralevu species as of 2026 see the complete, alphabetical list of species.
