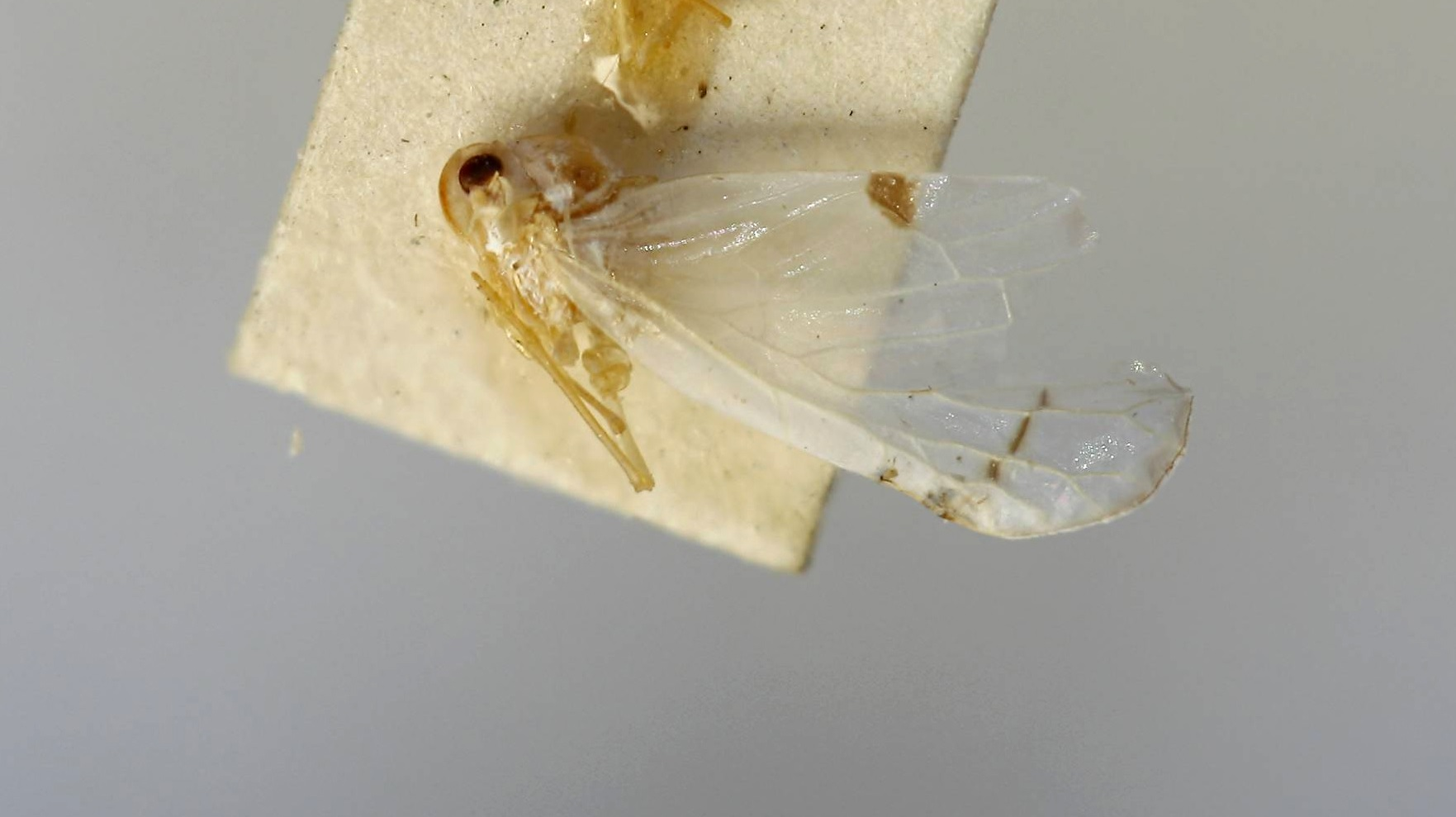
- Dichotropis amboinensis - holotype of Decora vettius, a synonym

Scientific classification
- Kingdom: Animalia
- Phylum: Arthropoda
- Clade: Pancrustacea
- Class: Insecta
- Order: Hemiptera
- Suborder: Auchenorrhyncha
- Infraorder: Fulgoromorpha
- Family: Derbidae
- Subfamily: Otiocerinae
- Tribe: Rhotanini
- Genus: Dichotropis; Muir 1913

= Dichotropis =

Genus of planthopper

Dichotropis is a small genus of planthoppers from the family Derbidae, tribe Rhotanini, currently with 9 species. The species are found on the island of New Guinea, including the Indonesian part and the neighbouring islands of New Britain and New Ireland. The distribution range of several species extends to other countries, as far as mainland Malaysia, Sumatra, southern China, the Philippines, the Solomon Islands and northern Australia. The adult hoppers are around 5–6 mm long from head to the tip of the wings. The species can be recognized by their white and powdered forewings which are carried in a roof-like position when the insects are at rest. The ridges on the sides of the face are separated and do not meet in front of the eyes. The body is typically straw-coloured or light brown. The ridges on the head may be orange or the whole head and body may be orange, but bright red marks are missing.

Type species: Dichotropis amboinensis Muir, 1913 - synonym: Decora vettius Fennah, 1970

== Distribution ==
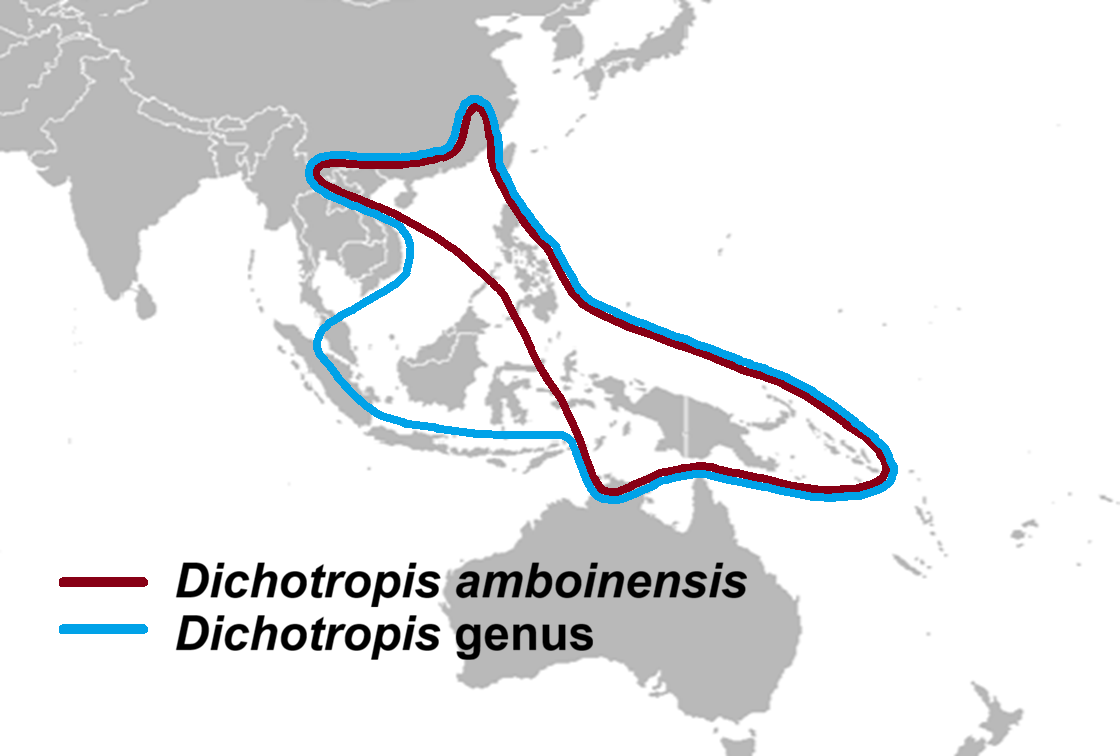
Distribution ranges of the species in the genus Dichotropis (blue outline) and that of Dichotropis amboinensis, the type species (brown outline)

The species of Dichotropis are found on the island of New Guinea, including the western, Indonesian part and surrounding islands like New Ireland and New Britain. Most have a very restricted distribution in New Guinea, but several have not only been collected in different parts of the island, but also in other countries. This includes the type species Dichotropis amboinensis which occurs in different parts of New Guinea, New Britain, New Ireland, and in other regions like Luzon Isl. in the Philippines, southern China (Yunnan and Fujian Provinces), east-central Indonesia (Ambon and Larat Island), Darwin (Northern Territory) in Australia, as well as in parts of the Solomon Islands. Similarly, Dichotropis peregrina has a wide distribution range from different parts of New Guinea, to Borneo, Singapore and West Malaysia. Dichotropis straatmani is also found in the Solomon Island, apart from New Guinea.

== Description ==
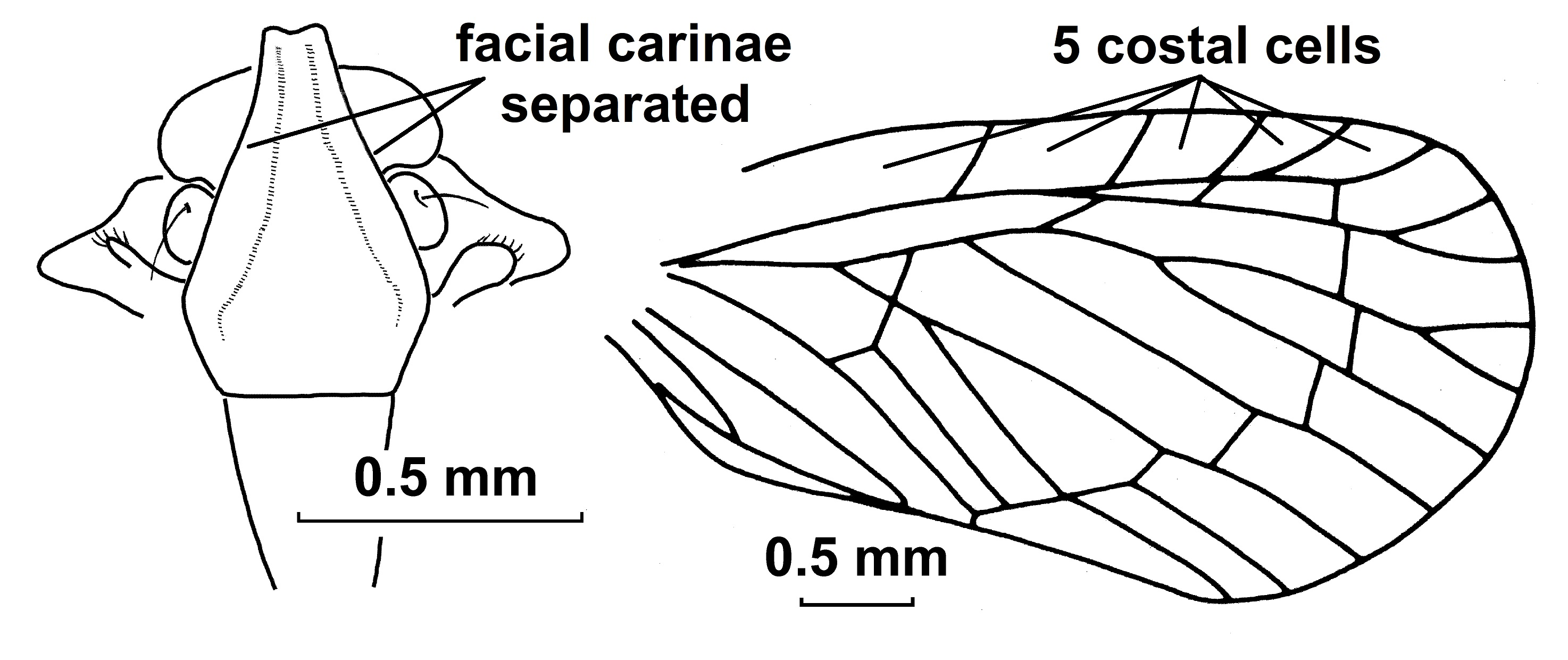
Left: Head in frontal view of Dichotropis amboinensis - Right: Forewing venation of Dichotropis straatmani

The species of Dichotropis resemble those of the genus Rhotana in size, shape and forewing venation. Like in Rhotana the forewings are very broad and the adult hoppers have a size of 5–6 mm from head to the tip of the wings. Like some species of Rhotana, they also carry their wings in a roof-like (tectiform) position. However, species of Dichotropis can be easily recognized by their white and powdered forewings. In addition, the males have a pair of unique processes that are not found in any other genera of Rhotanini. Another important feature are the ridges at the sides of the face and vertex, the facial carinae, which are separated and do not meet in front of the eyes. However, that feature is also found in some species of Rhotana.

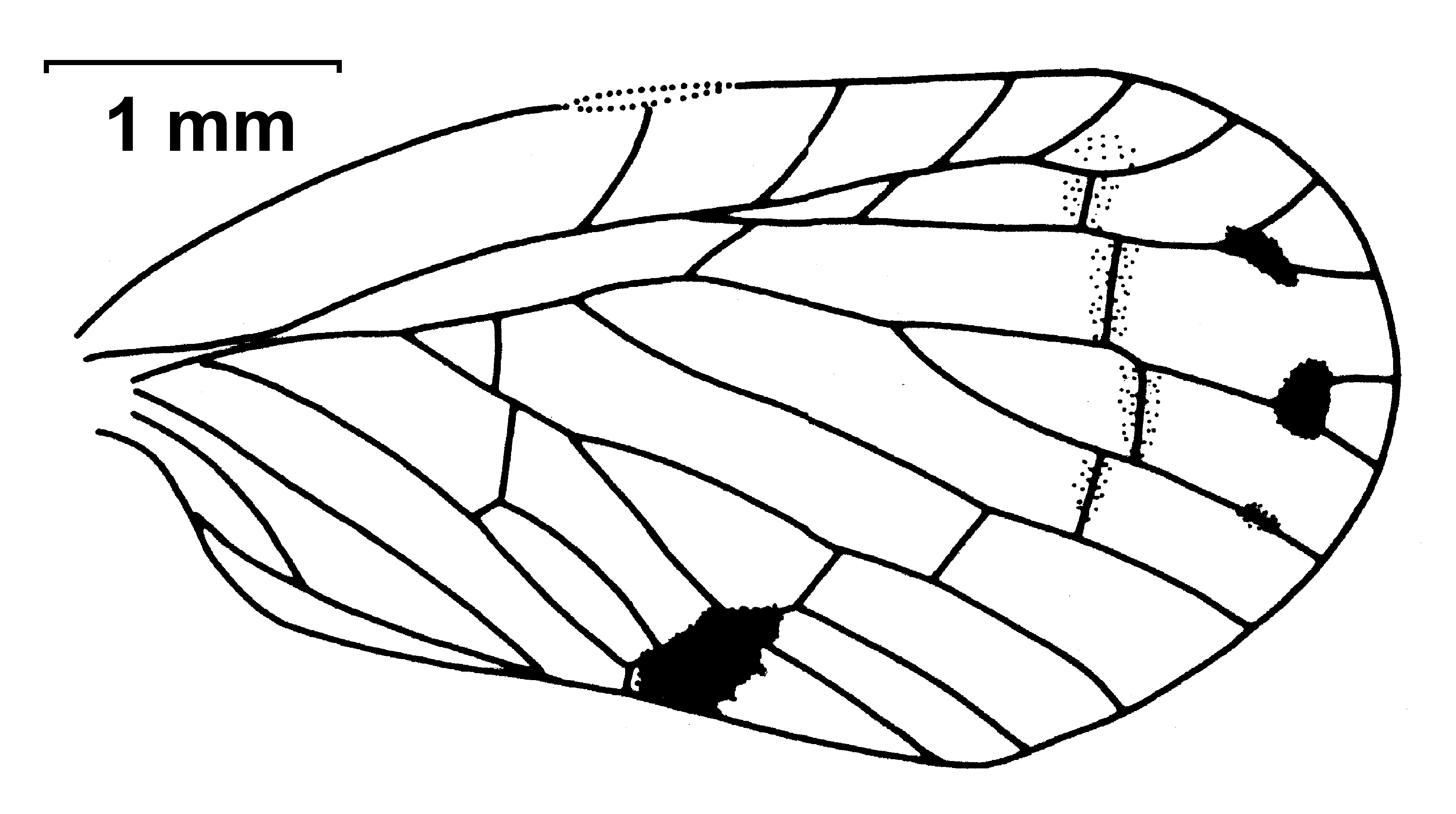
Forewing marks of Dichotropis flexuosa

The individual species can be distinguished by small black marks on the forewings and by some of the forewing veins being coloured brown or yellowish-brown with some adjacent areas of the wing also light brown, see for example the image of Dichotropis amboinensis in the taxobox on the top right. In some species, the facial carinae may be orange or brownish, or the whole head and pronotum may be orange. However, large black marks or bright red marks like they are found in Rhotana or other genera of Rhotanini are missing. Any black marks on the forewings are few and small and the snow-white, powdered forewings dominate the appearance in all species. The powder often disappears, however, in museum specimens. The species with the most and largest black marks on the forewings is Dichotropis flexuosa as illustrated on the right.

== Biology ==
Like in other genera of the Rhotanini, there is very little information on the biology of the species of Dichotropis. It is assumed that the nymphal stages live in decaying organic matter like other derbids, feeding on fungi. Even information on the host plants the adults feed on is scarce. Like other species of Rhotanini, they seem to prefer to feed on palms and other monocots.

== Taxonomy ==
In his original description Muir mentions the separated "facial keels" (facial carinae) as one of the main characters. Therefore, the name of the genus was apparently formed by a combination of the Ancient Greek words "dicho-" (διχου or δῐ́χᾰ) meaning apart and "tropis" (τρόπις) meaning a ships keel.

Separated facial carinae have been also described for some species of Rhotana and the genus Decora Dammerman, 1910 has long been regarded as being a genus of Rhotana-like species with separated facial carinae. Muir also mentioned the similarity between Dichotropis and the genus Decora. Moreover, in a later article, Muir had doubts about his definition of Dichotropis and listed it as a synonym of Decora. That synonymy was followed by other authors.

However, in the genus Rhotana there is a continuous range of fully separated to adjoining facial carinae. That range is even found in the Rhotana pavo species group, named after the type species of the genus Decora which had been originally described as Decora pavo Bierman, 1910. That group is mainly characterized by their forewing markings (see the Rhotana pavo species group described on the page for the genus Rhotana). Therefore, Decora is now regarded as a synonym of Rhotana.

In contrast, in the genus Dichotropis the separated facial carinae are found in all species and as mentioned above, there are several other features which separate the genus Dichotropis from the genus Rhotana.

As per 2026, the following 9 species have been described:

- Dichotropis amboinensis Muir 1913 (Maluku-Indonesia, New Guinea, New Britain, New Ireland, Solomon Isl., Northern Territory-Australia, Philippines, southern China, uncommon)
- Dichotropis brevis Zelazny 2011 (New Guinea, rare)
- Dichotropis flexuosa Zelazny 2011 (New Guinea, rare)
- Dichotropis maai Zelazny 2011 (New Guinea, rare)
- Dichotropis nivea Zelazny 2011 (New Guinea, rare)
- Dichotropis peregrina Zelazny 2011 (New Guinea, Borneo, West Malaysia, Singapore, uncommon)
- Dichotropis sedlacekorum Zelazny 2011 (New Guinea, rare)
- Dichotropis straatmani Zelazny 2011 (New Guinea, Solomon Isl., rare)
- Dichotropis sublimis Zelazny 2011 (New Guinea, rare)
