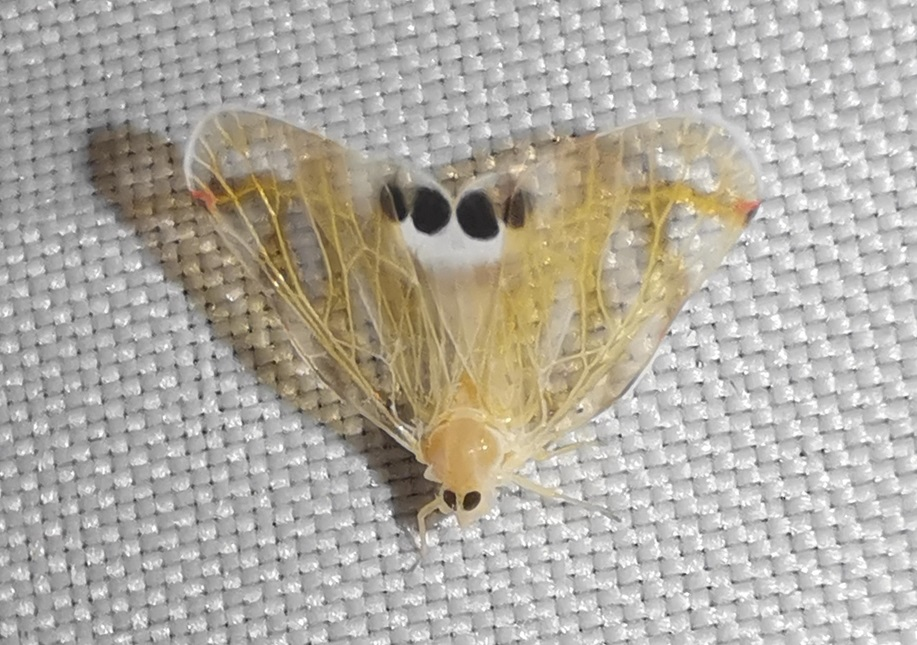
- Rhotana sp. from Thailand (Rhotana latipennis species group)

Scientific classification
- Kingdom: Animalia
- Phylum: Arthropoda
- Clade: Pancrustacea
- Class: Insecta
- Order: Hemiptera
- Suborder: Auchenorrhyncha
- Infraorder: Fulgoromorpha
- Family: Derbidae
- Subfamily: Otiocerinae
- Tribe: Rhotanini
- Genus: Rhotana; Walker, 1857

Synonyms
- Genestia Stål, 1858; Decora Dammerman, 1910

= Rhotana =

Genus of planthoppers

Rhotana is a large genus of planthoppers from the family Derbidae, tribe Rhotanini, with around 80 species. Most species have been reported from Borneo, Indonesia, New Guinea and China, mainly from rainforests. However, the distribution of the genus extends over a much wider area in southern and south-eastern Asia, as far north as southern Japan and including parts of the Pacific islands as well as Australia. The species are the largest in the tribe Rhotanini, typically between 5–6 mm from head to the tip of the wings. The forewings frequently have striking patterns and colours, some species have also marks on the hind wings.

Type species: Rhotana latipennis Walker, 1857

== Distribution ==
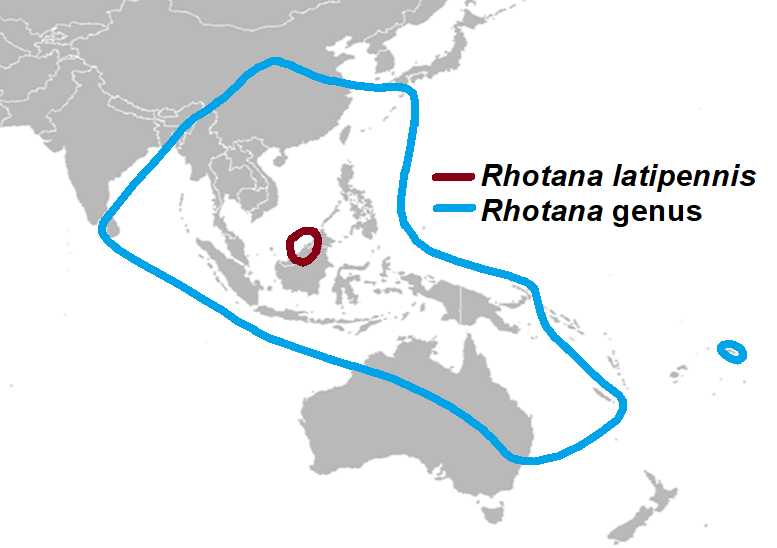
Distribution ranges of the species in the genus Rhotana (blue outline) and that of the type species, Rhotana latipennis (brown outline)

Most of the species of Rhotana have been reported from the islands of Borneo (22 species including the type species), China (18 species) and the island of New Guinea (16 species). However, Rhotana has a much wider distribution, ranging from Sri Lanka (5 species) in the West, over southern parts of mainland Asia like Myanmar (1 species), north-eastern India (1 species), Laos (1 species), Vietnam (3 species) and Taiwan (6 species), to southern parts of Japan (2 species) in the North. In south-eastern Asia and the Australia/Pacific region, the distribution includes the remaining parts of Indonesia (13 species), the Philippines (8 species), New Caledonia (2 species), as well as northern and eastern parts of Australia (6 species). There is also one species reported from Samoa, further in the East.

== Description ==
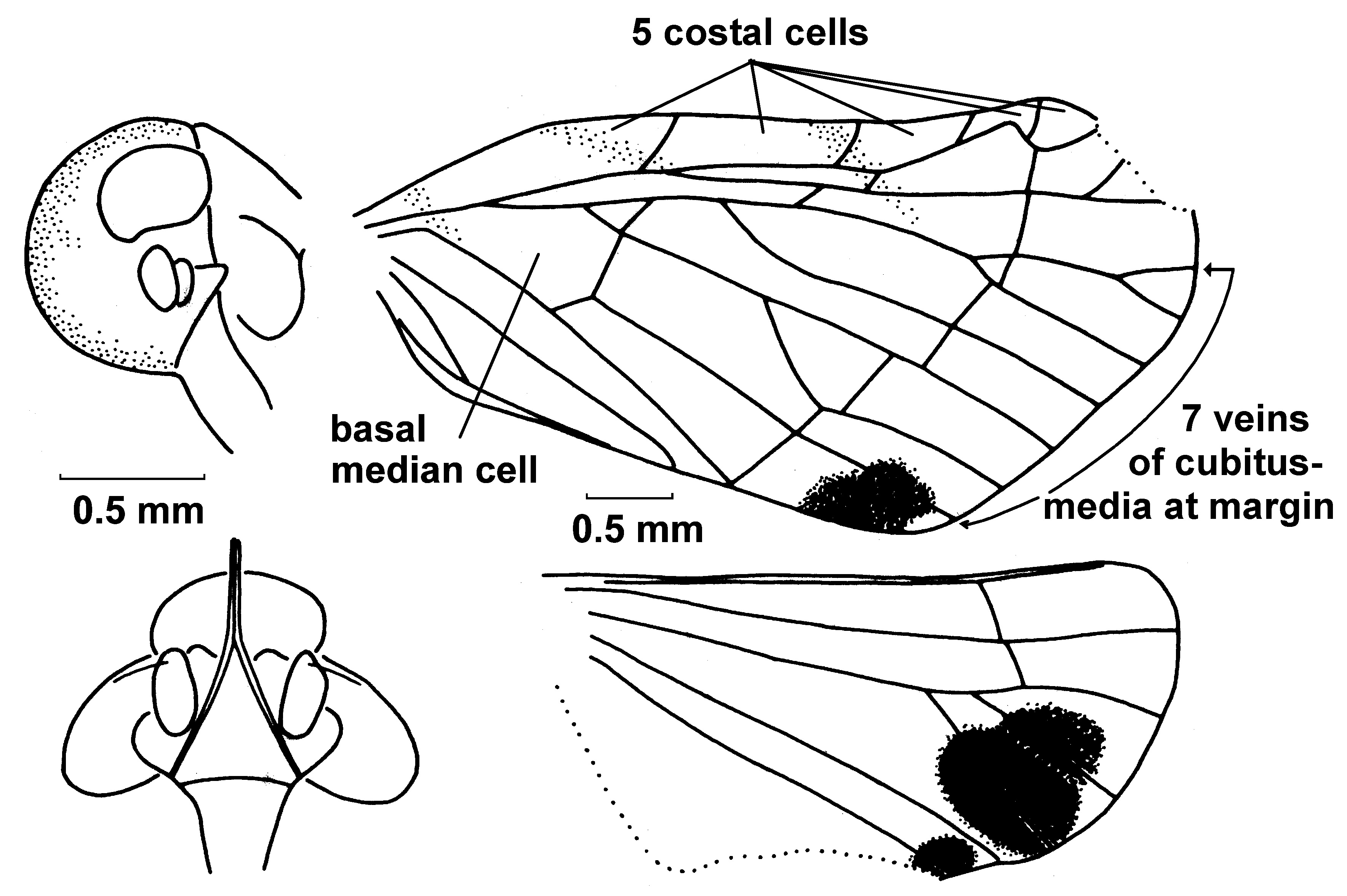
Head and wings of Rhotana latipennis

The genus Rhotana is a diverse group of planthoppers with broad, often colourful forewings. The forewing venation is similar compared to that of its sister genus Levu, with 5 costal cells and 7 veins of the cubitus-media complex reaching the margin at the end of the wing. However, the forewings of Rhotana have a broader basal median cell, are more transparent and are not powdered. Only some patches on the wings may be powdered, see the image of Rhotana marmorata in the gallery below. In addition, the species are larger compared to those of Levu, reaching a length of 5–7 mm from head to the tip of the wings. However, the smallest species of Rhotana have a size similar to the largest species of Levu. The head has a rounded profile with 2 facial ridges which usually (but not always) meet near the junction between face and vertex.

In some species, the forewings are held in a roof-like position when the insects are at rest (see the gallery below), in others both wing surfaces form a common plane (see the taxobox at the top right). In the later case the insects often raise the wings in a way to display the marks on the hind wings. This wing position is not preserved in museum specimens and it is unknown how consistent it is among the different species and species groups. However, raising the wings seems to be associated with marks on the hind wings. This variation in the wing position is also found in the genus Levu but not in other genera of Rhotanini. Hind wing marks have not been described in other genera of the tribe Rhotanini.

The diversity of wing patterns and colourations among species of Rhotana is also noticeable. It ranges from forms like Rhotana albata and Rhotana ramentosa that are mainly straw-coloured to light brownish with few if any marks, to forms like Rhotana miles that are dark reddish-brown with red forewing veins. There may also be bright red marks on the head. The forewings can show various patterns like a series of conspicuous black dots or bright red marks. In a number of species, black marks on the hindwings may also be prominent. Some of these colour forms and wing patterns are shown in the gallery below:

Diversity of forewing patterns in species of Rhotana

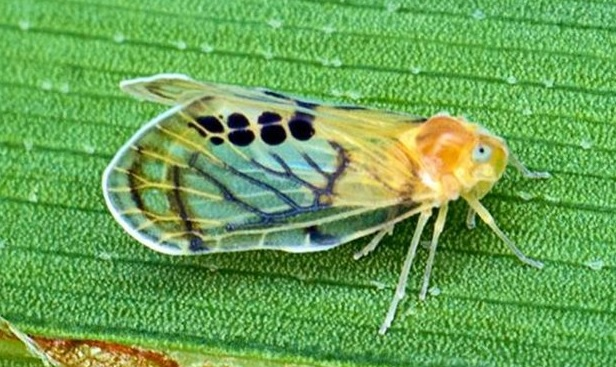
Rhotana gressittorum

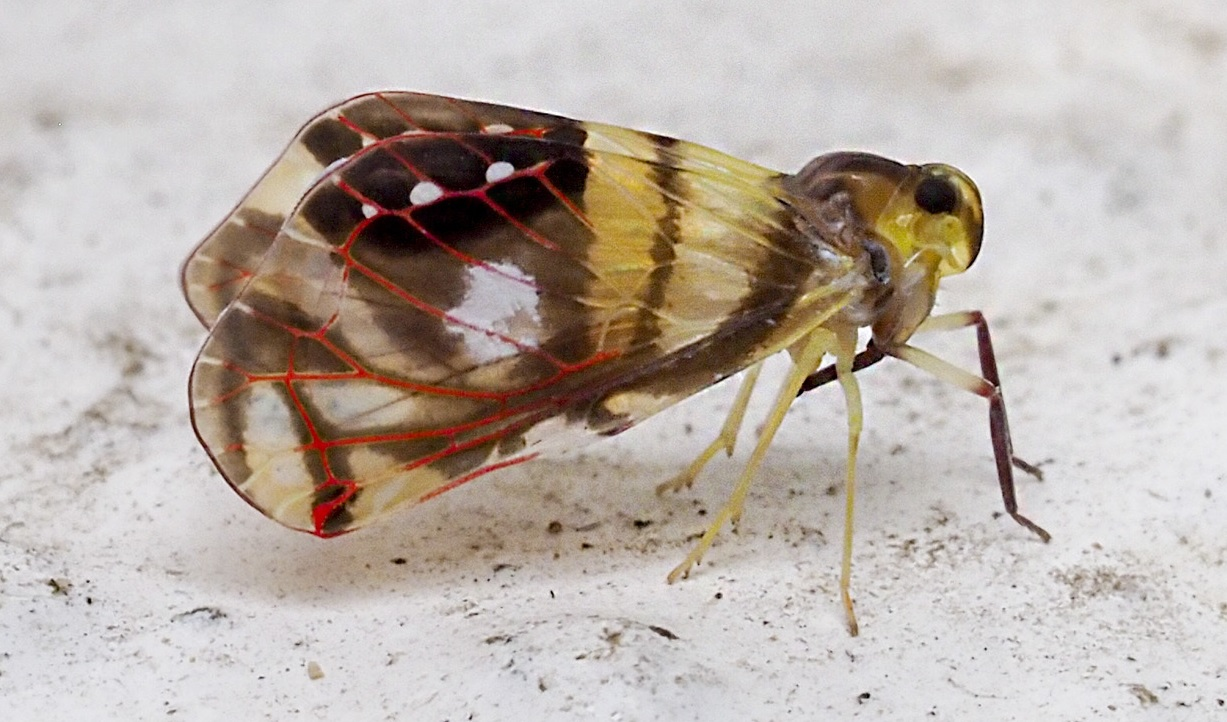
Rhotana marmorata

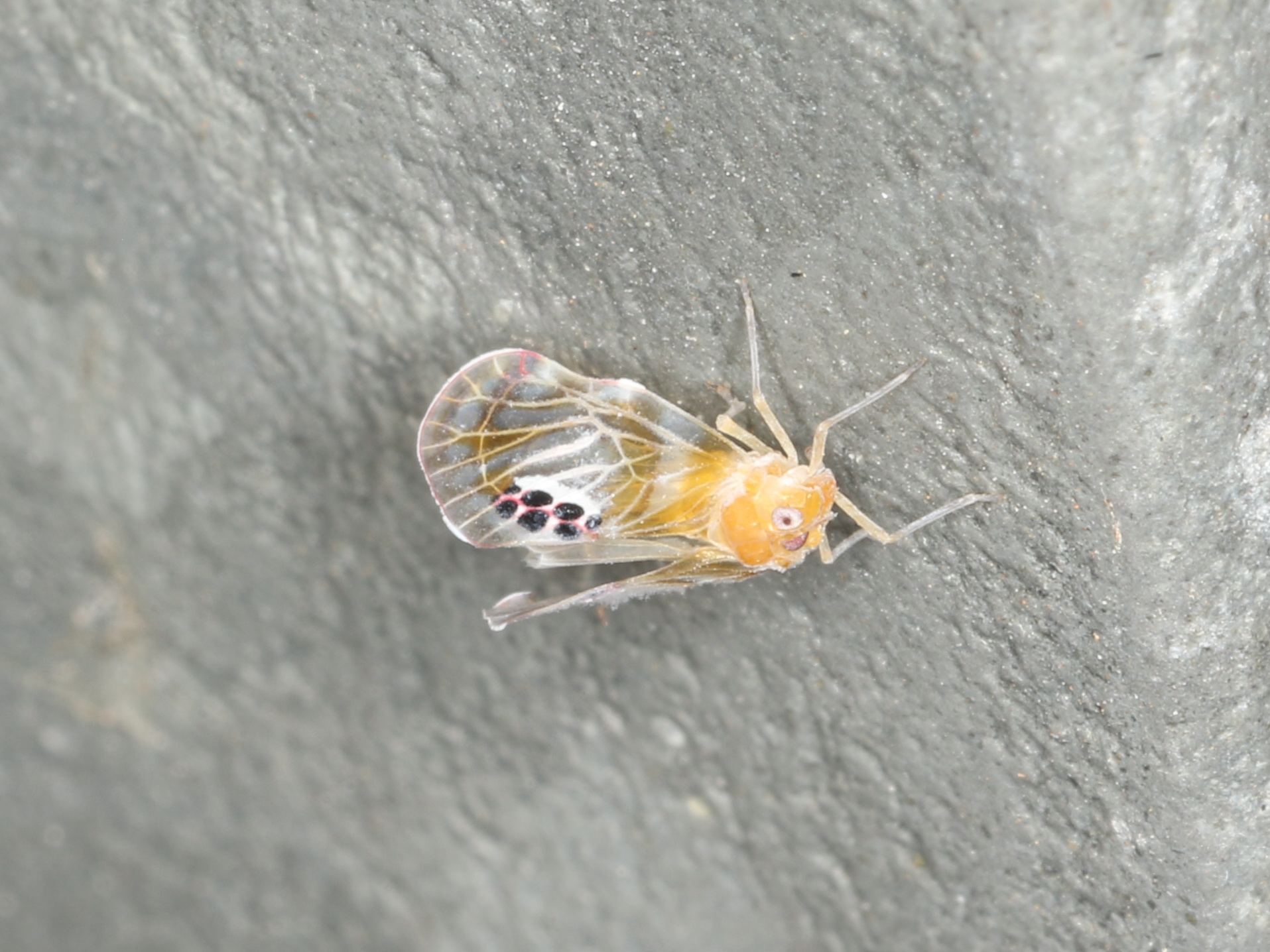
Rhotana septemmaculata

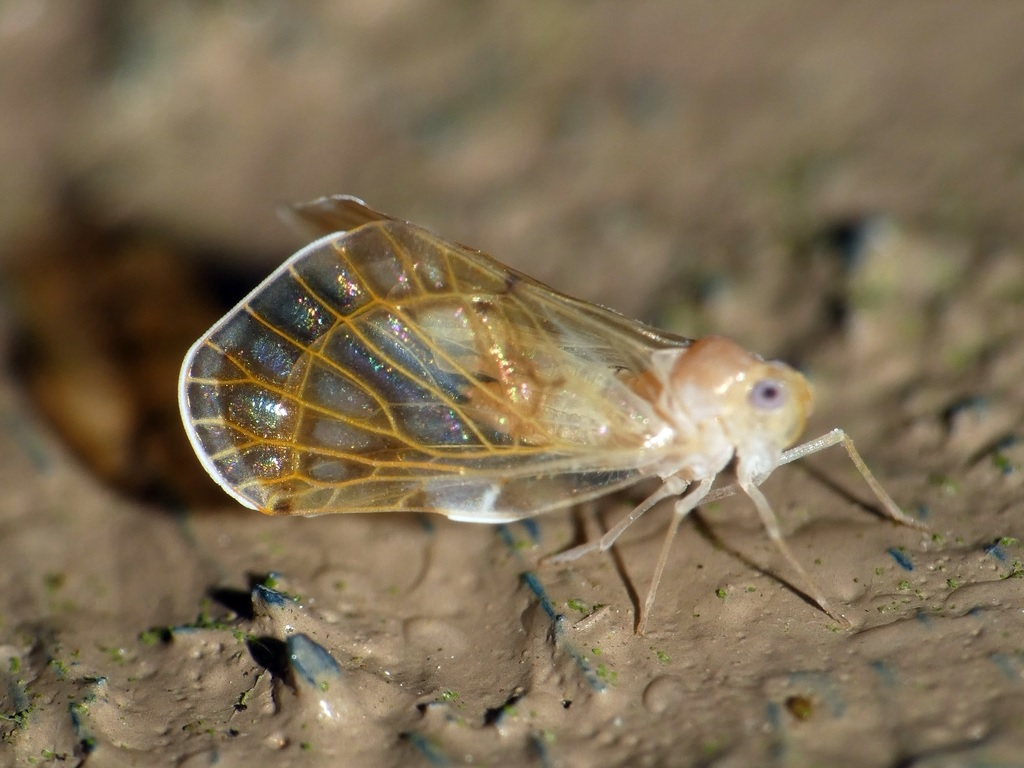
Rhotana sp. possibly R. ramentosa

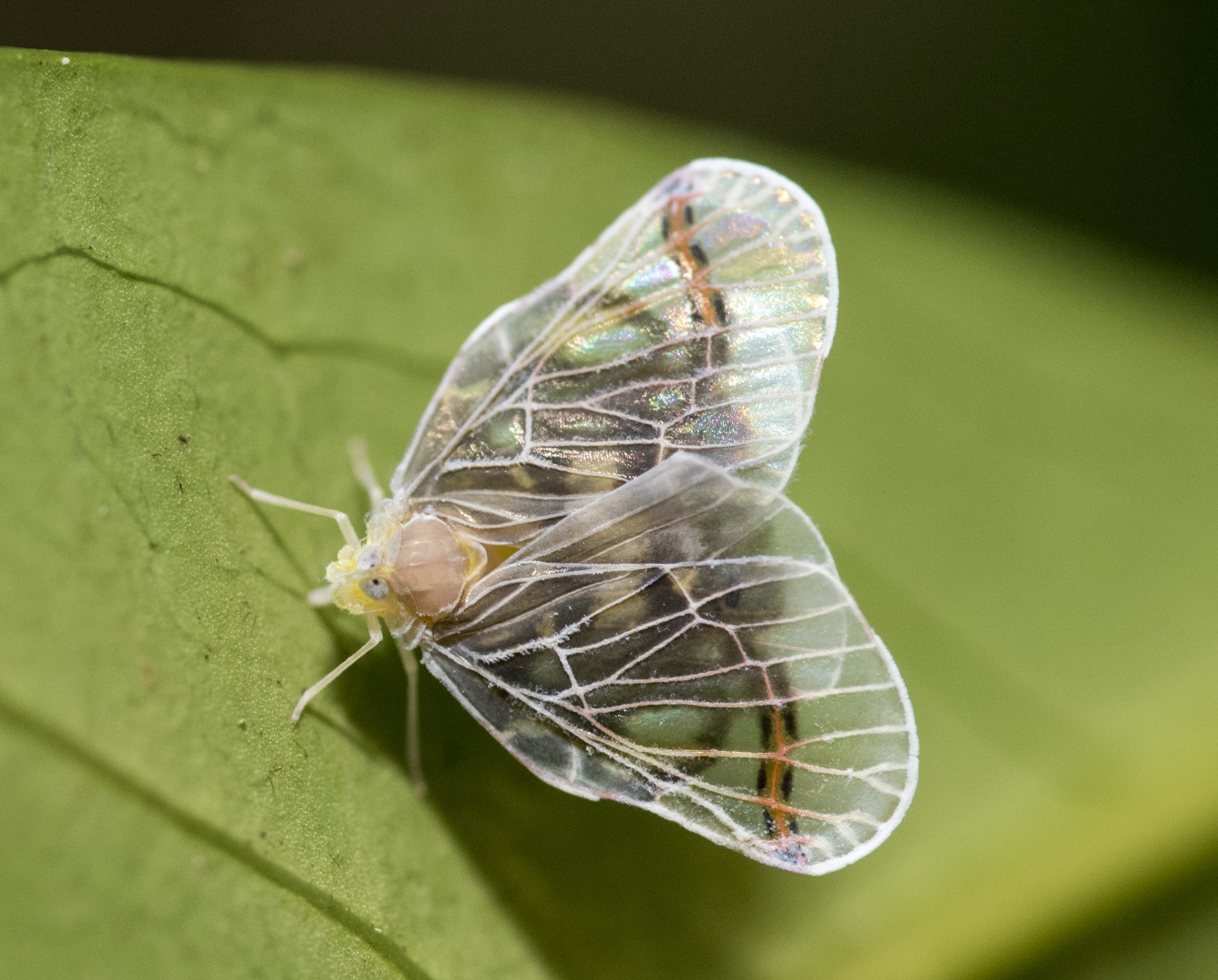
Rhotana obaerata

== Biology ==
There is almost no information on the biology of the species of Rhotana. It is assumed that the nymphal stages live in decaying organic matter like other derbids, feeding on fungi. Even information on the host plants the adults feed on is rare. In fact, host plant data seem to be available only for Rhotana excelsa which has been collected from coconut palms (Cocos nucifera) and abaca (Musa textile) in the Philippines.

== Taxonomy and species groups ==
A total of 81 species of Rhotana have been described (as of 2026) and 58 of these have been assigned to 6 species groups, as they show obvious similarities in wing markings, colouration and vein patterns. These species groups are briefly described below and their main features are illustrated and in most cases marked by arrows:

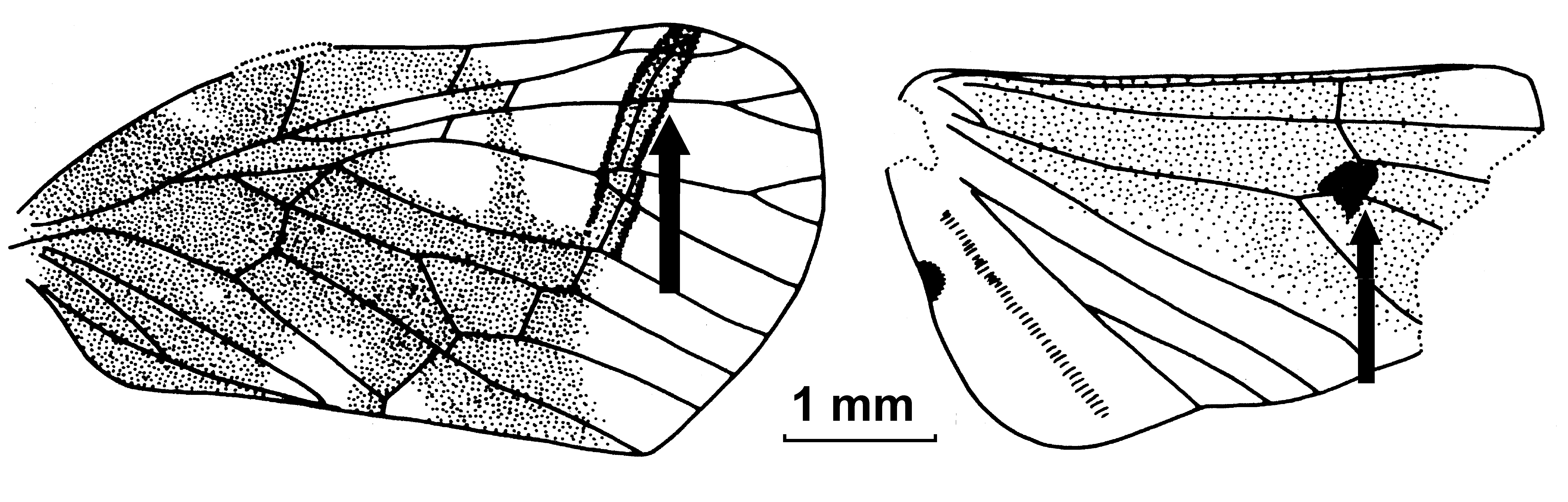
Wings of Rhotana formosana showing characteristic marks (arrows)

- Rhotana formosana species group - This group includes 5 species that are found in southern Japan, Taiwan, parts of mainland Asia (southern China, Vietnam, Malaysia), Borneo, Sumatra and Java. The main features of this group are dark stripes lining the anterior apical cross veins on the forewings and one or several black marks on the hind wings not far from the wing margin.
- Rhotana latipennis species group - This group includes 18 species that are found in Sri Lanka, Borneo, West Malaysia, Philippines, China, Taiwan and southern Japan. The main feature of this group are one or several prominent black mark(s) on the hind wing next to the wing margin. See the image of Rhotana latipennis above.

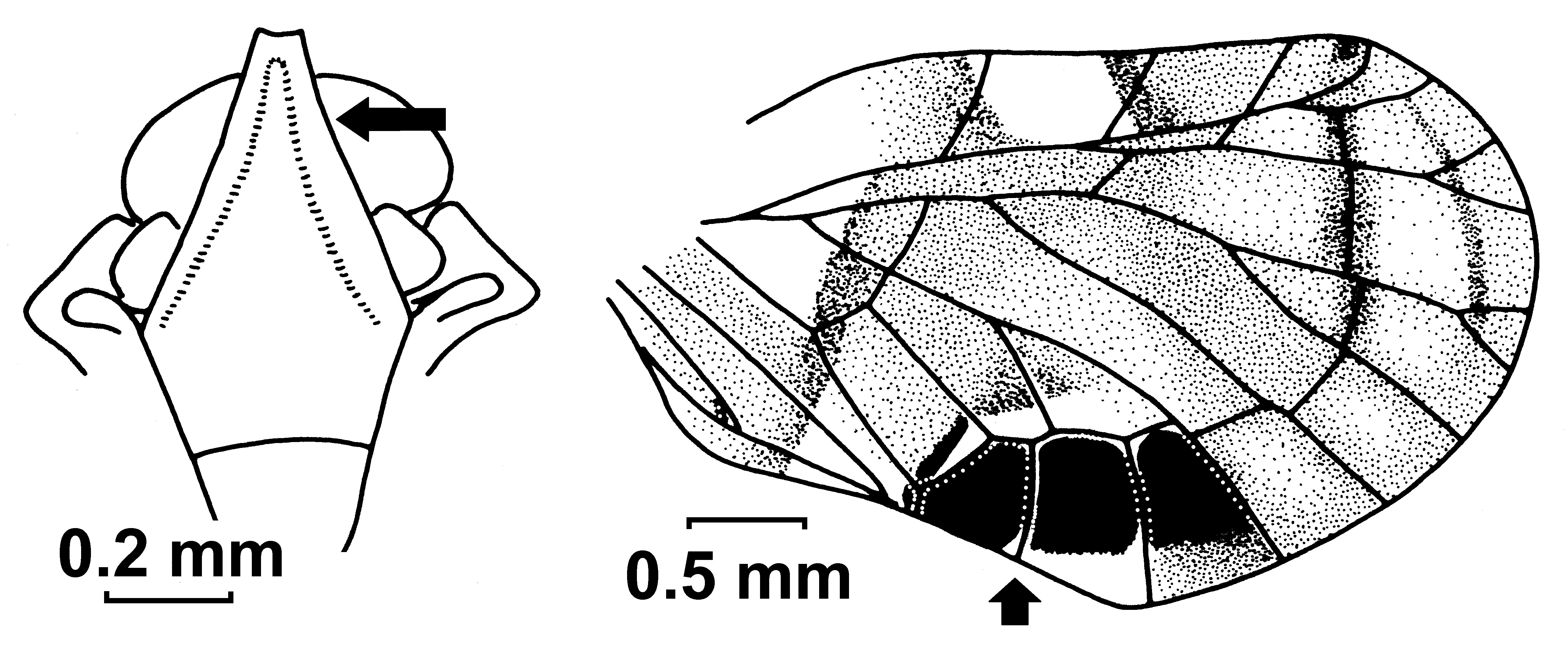
Head and forewing of Rhotana triplex showing the separated ridges on the sides of the face and the tip of a branch of the cubitus anterior directed backwards on the forewing (arrows)

- Rhotana melichari species group - This group includes 4 species that are found in New Guinea and neighbouring islands. The species are characterized by the ridges on the sides of the face being separated at the base and the forewing having the end of a branch of the cubitus anterior directed backwards towards the wing base.

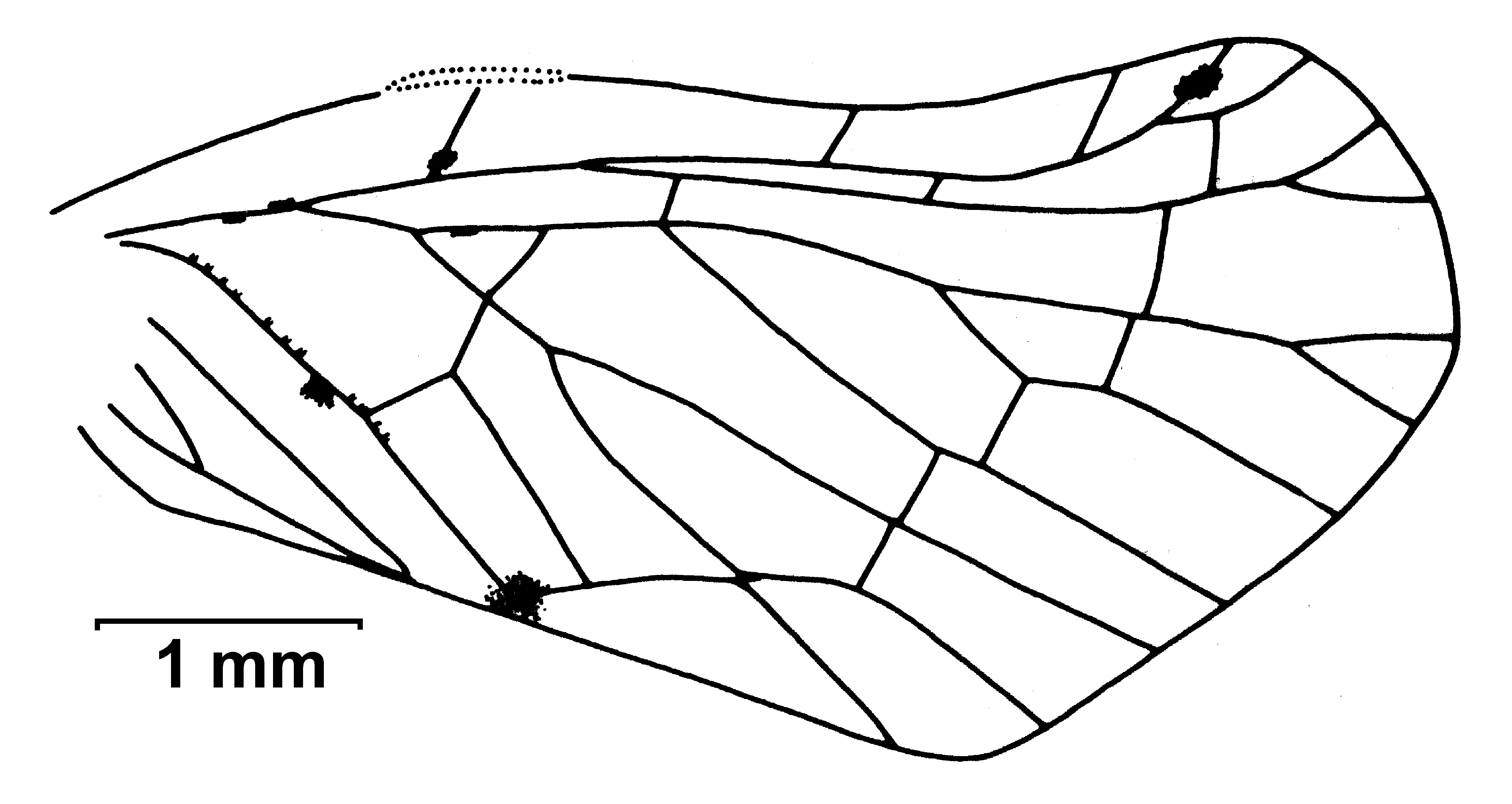
Forewing of Rhotana ramosa

- Rhotana ornata species group - This group includes 7 species that are found in the southern parts of the Philippines, Borneo, Sumatra, Malaysia and China. The species can be recognized by the forewings which are colourless, except for a few small black marks.

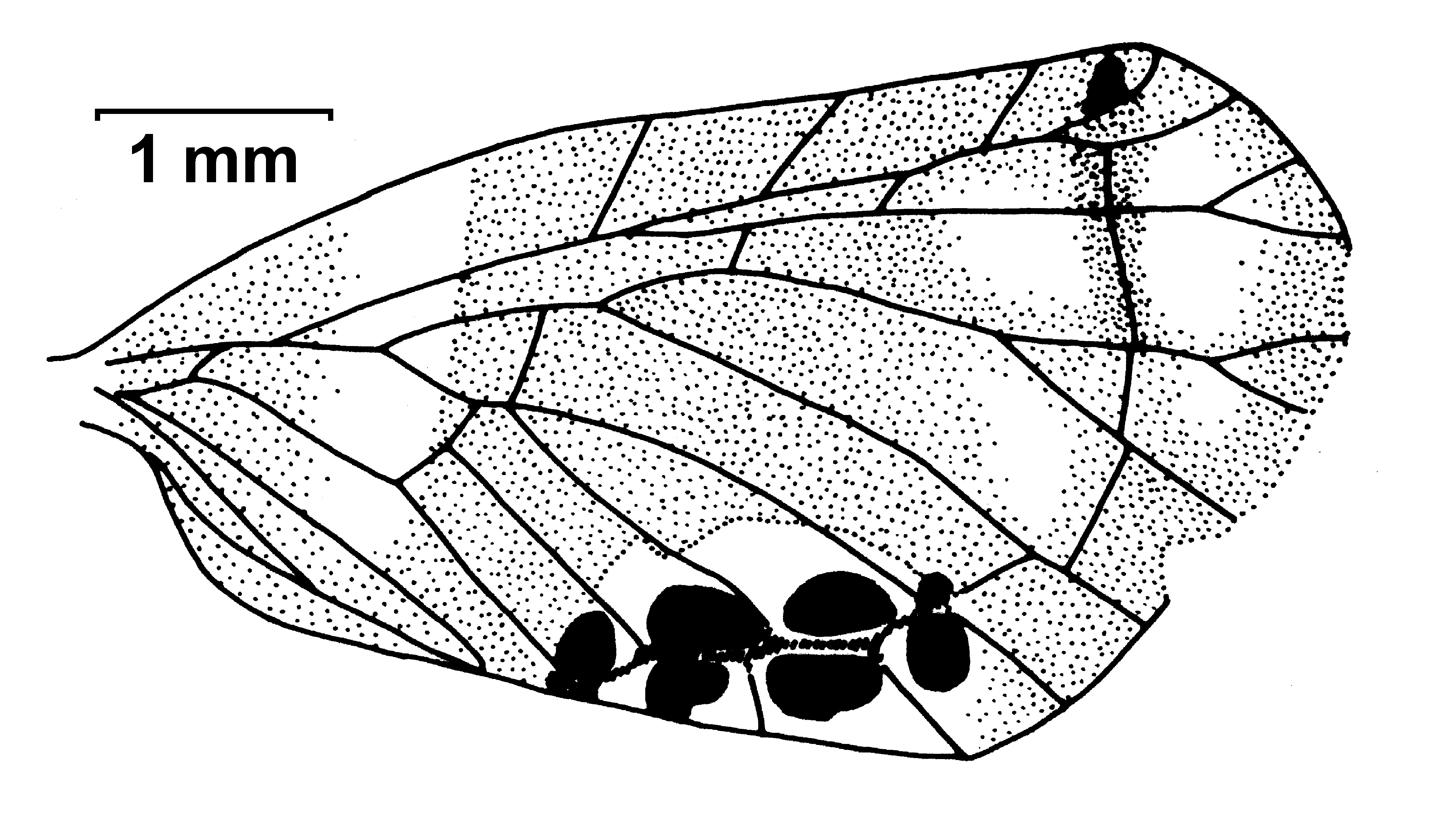
Forewing of Rhotana pavo

- Rhotana pavo species group - This group includes 22 species that are found on the island of New Guinea and surrounding islands, Indonesia and northern Borneo, China, the Philippines, New Caledonia, as well as parts of Australia. The main character are two rows of prominent black marks near the hind margin of the forewing, with a total of 7 or 8 marks. The veins separating the marks are usually bright red and the red colour may extend to the areas adjoining the veins. Rhotana pavo was originally described as Decora pavo by Bierman in 1910 and is the type species of the genus Decora which is now regarded as a synonym of Rhotana. In the original description, it is mentioned that the genus Decora has many similarities to the genus Rhotana, however, no differences between both genera were described. Subsequent authors, like Fennah, have described the genus Decora as Rhotana-like species in which the ridges on the side of the face (the facial carinae) are separated between the eyes. In fact, in Rhotana pavo the facial carinae are only slightly separated between the eyes, but they meet in other species of this group and in still others they are well separated. Therefore, the separation of the facial carinae is not a reliable character for a group or a genus and this variation is also found in other groups of Rhotana.

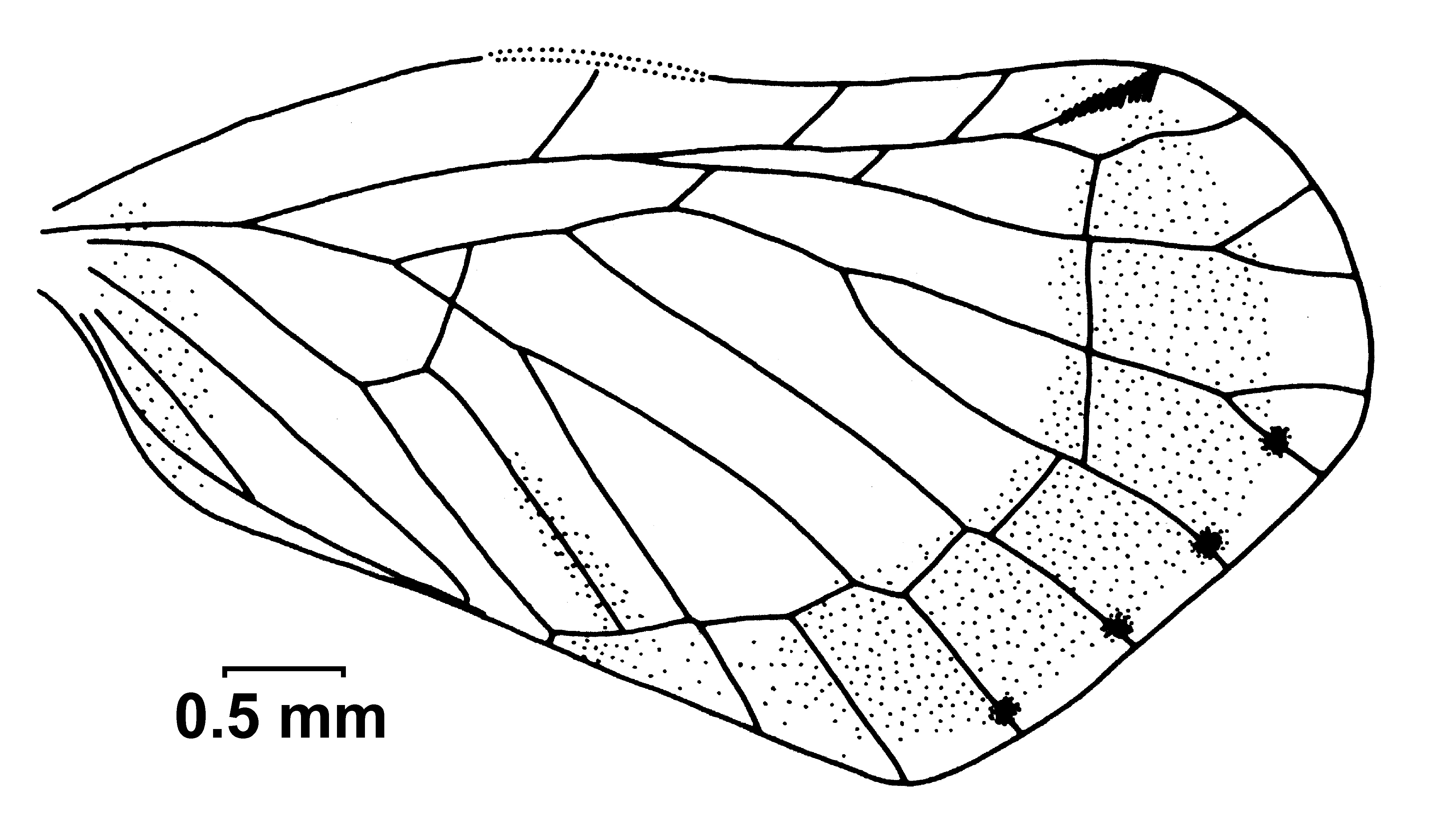
Forewing of Rhotana quadrimaculata

- Rhotana quadrimaculata species group - This group includes 2 species (R. quadrimaculata and R. ramentosa) that are found in Queensland, Australia. They are characterized by 2 or 4 black dots around the tips of the media branches, as well as by the ridges at the sides of the face being separated at their base.

Almost all species are uncommon or rare. They are often restricted to relatively small geographic areas. For all Rhotana species as of 2026 see the complete, alphabetical list of species.
