= List of Saccharodite species =

Genus of planthoppers

The following species in the insect genus Saccharodite (family Derbidae, tribe Rhotanini) are recognized as of 2026. Basionyms are given in square brackets.

- Saccharodite abnormis Zelazny 2011 (North Borneo, rare)
- Saccharodite aculeata Zelazny 2011 (North Borneo, rare)
- Saccharodite acuta Yang & Wu 1993 (Taiwan, uncommon)
- Saccharodite affinis Zelazny 2011 (North Borneo, Hainan Isl., China, uncommon)
- Saccharodite altissima Zelazny 2011 (New Guinea at high altitude, can be moderately common)
- Saccharodite aquila Zelazny 2011 (North Borneo, rare)
- Saccharodite aucta Zelazny 2011 (New Guinea Island, uncommon)
- Saccharodite aurora Zelazny 2011 (North Borneo, rare)
- Saccharodite bakeri Zelazny 2011 (North Borneo, uncommon)
- Saccharodite bannaensis Chen & Zhang 2026 (Yunnan, China, rare)
- Saccharodite basicolorata Zelazny 1981 (Philippines, can be moderately common)
- Saccharodite basipunctulata (Melichar 1914) [Rhotana basipunctulata] (Philippines including the type locality in Los Baños in Laguna Prov., Sumatra, Borneo, Maluku Islands, New Guinea, New Britain, New Ireland, Solomon Islands, Queensland-Australia, Chuuk Lagoon-Micronesia, Palau Isl., West Malaysia, Thailand, Laos, Hainan Isl. in China, Myanmar, Sri Lanka, moderately common to common)
- Saccharodite bicornis Zelazny 1981 (Mindanao Isl., Philippines, uncommon)
- Saccharodite bos Zelazny 2011 (North Borneo, uncommon)
- Saccharodite carens Zelazny 2011 (North Borneo, rare)
- Saccharodite casca Fennah 1969 (New Caledonia, rare)
- Saccharodite cervetta Zelazny 2011 (North Borneo, rare)
- Saccharodite chinensis Zelazny 2011 (southern China, rare)
- Saccharodite chrysonoe (Kirkaldy 1906) [Rhotana chrysonoe] (eastern Australia from Queensland to Tasmania, moderately common)
- Saccharodite coccinea (Matsumura 1940) [Rhotana coccinea] (Japan, Taiwan, southern China, Laos, Thailand, Philippines, West Malaysia, Borneo, Sumatra, New Guinea, New Britain, moderately common)
- Saccharodite colorata Zelazny 2011 (North Borneo, rare)
- Saccharodite conducta Zelazny 2011 (Papua New Guinea, rare)
- Saccharodite cornicula Zelazny 1981 (Philippines, uncommon)
- Saccharodite costa Zelazny 2011 (Borneo?, rare)
- Saccharodite crispa Zelazny 2011 (New Caledonia, uncommon)
- Saccharodite cruenta Zelazny 2011 (Borneo, Sumatra, Thailand, can be moderately common)
- Saccharodite dionaea Zelazny 2011 (Solomon Isl. and Bougainville, uncommon)
- Saccharodite doddi Zelazny 2011 (Queensland, Australia, rare)
- Saccharodite eburnea Zelazny 2011 (North Borneoa, uncommon)
- Saccharodite egregia Zelazny 2011 (New Guinea, rare)
- Saccharodite extraria Zelazny 2011 (Western New Guinea Isl., rare)
- Saccharodite fasciata Zelazny 2011 (Papua New Guinea, uncommon)
- Saccharodite foliata Zelazny 2011 (North Borneo, can be common)
- Saccharodite gagnei Zelazny 2011 (New Caledonia, rare)
- Saccharodite guamana (Fennah 1956) [new name for Muiralyricen ruber Metcalf 1946] (Guam and Palau Islands, uncommon)
- Saccharodite hollowayi Zelazny 2011 (North Borneo, rare)
- Saccharodite ignea Zelazny 2011 (North Borneo, rare)
- Saccharodite imperiali Zelazny 1981 (Philippines, North Borneo, southern China, moderately common)
- Saccharodite indochinensis Zelazny 2011 (Laos, Hainan Isl. in China, uncommon)
- Saccharodite inermis Zelazny 1981 (Mindanao Isl., Philippines, uncommon)
- Saccharodite insulana Zelazny 2011 (Solomon Isl., uncommon)
- Saccharodite iridipennis (Melichar 1903) [Rhotana iridipennis] (Sri Lanka, uncommon)
- Saccharodite jianfenglingensis Chen & Zhang 2026 (Hainan Isl., China, uncommon)
- Saccharodite joycei Zelazny 2011 (Fiji Isl., rare)
- Saccharodite kagoshimana (Matsumura 1914) [Rhotana kagoshimana] (Japan, Indonesia, Malaysia, Myanmar, uncommon)
- Saccharodite lamina Zelazny 2011 (North Borneo, uncommon)
- Saccharodite laratica (Muir 1913) [Levu laratica] (Larat Isl. and Island of New Guinea, uncommon)
- Saccharodite lata Zelazny 2011 (North Borneo, rare)
- Saccharodite ligata Zelazny 2011 (New Caledonia, rare)
- Saccharodite longuida Zelazny 2011 (West Malaysia, rare)
- Saccharodite lucifera Zelazny 2011 (North Borneo, rare)
- Saccharodite lugubris Zelazny 2011 (North Borneo, rare)
- Saccharodite lutea Zelazny 1981 (Philippines, Borneo, uncommon)
- Saccharodite luteoides Chen & Zhang 2026 (southern China, uncommon)
- Saccharodite luzonensis Zelazny 1981 (Luzon Isl., Philippines, rare)
- Saccharodite mappa Zelazny 2011 (North Borneo, rare)
- Saccharodite matsumurae (Muir 1915) [Levu matsumurae] (Taiwan, uncommon)
- Saccharodite media Zelazny 2011 (New Guinea, rare)
- Saccharodite metcalfi Zelazny 1981 (Mindanao Isl., Philippines, uncommon to moderately common)
- Saccharodite millironi Zelazny 1981 (Mindanao Isl., Philippines, uncommon to moderately common)
- Saccharodite minuscula Zelazny 2011 (Islands of New Guinea and New Britain, uncommon to moderately common)
- Saccharodite misamensis Zelazny 1981 (Mindanao Isl., Philippines, uncommon)
- Saccharodite modesta Zelazny 2011 (Island of New Guinea, moderately common)
- Saccharodite montana Zelazny 2011 (Island of New Guinea, uncommon)
- Saccharodite nanus Zelazny 2011 (Island of New Guinea, rare)
- Saccharodite nervosa Zelazny 2011 (Island of New Guinea, uncommon)
- Saccharodite nigra Zelazny 2011 (Island of New Guinea, rare)
- Saccharodite nigrolineata Chen & Zhang 2026 (southern China, rare)
- Saccharodite nishidai Zelazny 2011 (Island of New Guinea, uncommon)
- Saccharodite obrieni Zelazny 2011 (Solomon Islands, uncommon)
- Saccharodite obtusa Yang & Wu 1993 (Taiwan, uncommon)
- Saccharodite palauensis (Fennah 1956) [Levu matsumurae palauensis] (Palau Islands, rare)
- Saccharodite perlucida Zelazny 2011 (North Borneo, uncommon)
- Saccharodite picta Zelazny 2011 (Island of New Guinea, rare)
- Saccharodite pirum Zelazny 2011 (Island of New Guinea, uncommon)
- Saccharodite plurima Zelazny 2011 (North Borneo, moderately common to common)
- Saccharodite ponapeana (Fennah 1956) [Levu matsumurae ponapeana] (Ponape Island in Micronesia, uncommon)
- Saccharodite propinqua Zelazny 2011 (North Borneo, uncommon)
- Saccharodite pulla Zelazny 2011 (Island of New Guinea, rare)
- Saccharodite punctata Zelazny 2011 (Island of New Guinea, rare)
- Saccharodite purpurea Zelazny 2011 (Bougainville Island and Solomon Islands, rare)
- Saccharodite qixianlingensis Chen & Zhang 2026 (southern China, uncommon)
- Saccharodite quinalayoi Zelazny 1981 (Philippines, uncommon to moderately common)
- Saccharodite rhinoceros Zelazny 1981 (Mindanao Isl., Philippines and North Borneo, uncommon to moderately common)
- Saccharodite rhomboidea Wang & Wang 2024 (south-western China, uncommon)
- Saccharodite rosea Zelazny 2011 (Island of New Guinea, rare)
- Saccharodite rostrata Zelazny 2011 (Sumatra and Borneo, rare)
- Saccharodite rubilineata Zelazny 2011 (Solomon Islands, uncommon)
- Saccharodite rubirostrata Zelazny 1981 (Mindanao Isl., Philippines, uncommon)
- Saccharodite rubra (Muir 1913) [Levu rubra] (Ambon Isl., Maluku Islands, Indonesia, rare)
- Saccharodite rubrovenis Zelazny 1981 (Mindanao Isl., Philippines, rare)
- Saccharodite rufa Zelazny 2011 (North Borneo, rare)
- Saccharodite sanguinea Kirkaldy 1907 (Java, Indonesia)
- Saccharodite satyrus Zelazny 2011 (Sumatra, rare)
- Saccharodite saucia Zelazny 2011 (North Borneo, rare)
- Saccharodite scissa Zelazny 2011 (North Borneo, uncommon)
- Saccharodite securifera Zelazny 2011 (Borneo, Sumatra and West Malaysia, uncommon)
- Saccharodite separata Zelazny 1981 (Mindanao and Basilan Islands, Philippines, uncommon)
- Saccharodite sexangula Wang & Wang 2024 (south-western China, uncommon)
- Saccharodite siamensis Zelazny 2011 (Thailand, rare)
- Saccharodite singularis Yang & Wu 1993 (Taiwan, uncommon)
- Saccharodite solitaria Zelazny 2011 (Island of New Guinea, rare)
- Saccharodite spinosa Zelazny 1981 (Philippines and Borneo, uncommon)
- Saccharodite terebra Zelazny 1981 (Mindanao Isl., Borneo, West Malaysia, uncommon to moderately common)
- Saccharodite teres Zelazny 2011 (New Caledonia, rare)
- Saccharodite thia Fennah 1969 (New Caledonia, uncommone)
- Saccharodite timida Zelazny 2011 (North Borneo, uncommon)
- Saccharodite toroensis (Matsumura 1914) [Rhotana toroensis] (Taiwan, uncommon)
- Saccharodite triangula Wang & Wang 2024 (south-western China, uncommon)
- Saccharodite tricuspis Zelazny 2011 (North Borneo, uncommon to moderately common)
- Saccharodite variabilis Zelazny 2011 (Island of New Guinea, uncommon)
- Saccharodite vietnamensis Zelazny 2011 (Vietnam, rare)
- Saccharodite viperina Zelazny 2011 (Borneo and West Malaysia, uncommon)
- Saccharodite virgata Zelazny 1981 (Philippines and North Borneo, moderately common)
- Saccharodite virgula Zelazny 2011 (North Borneo, uncommon)
- Saccharodite vitrea Zelazny 2011 (Island of New Guinea and Solomon Island, uncommon)
