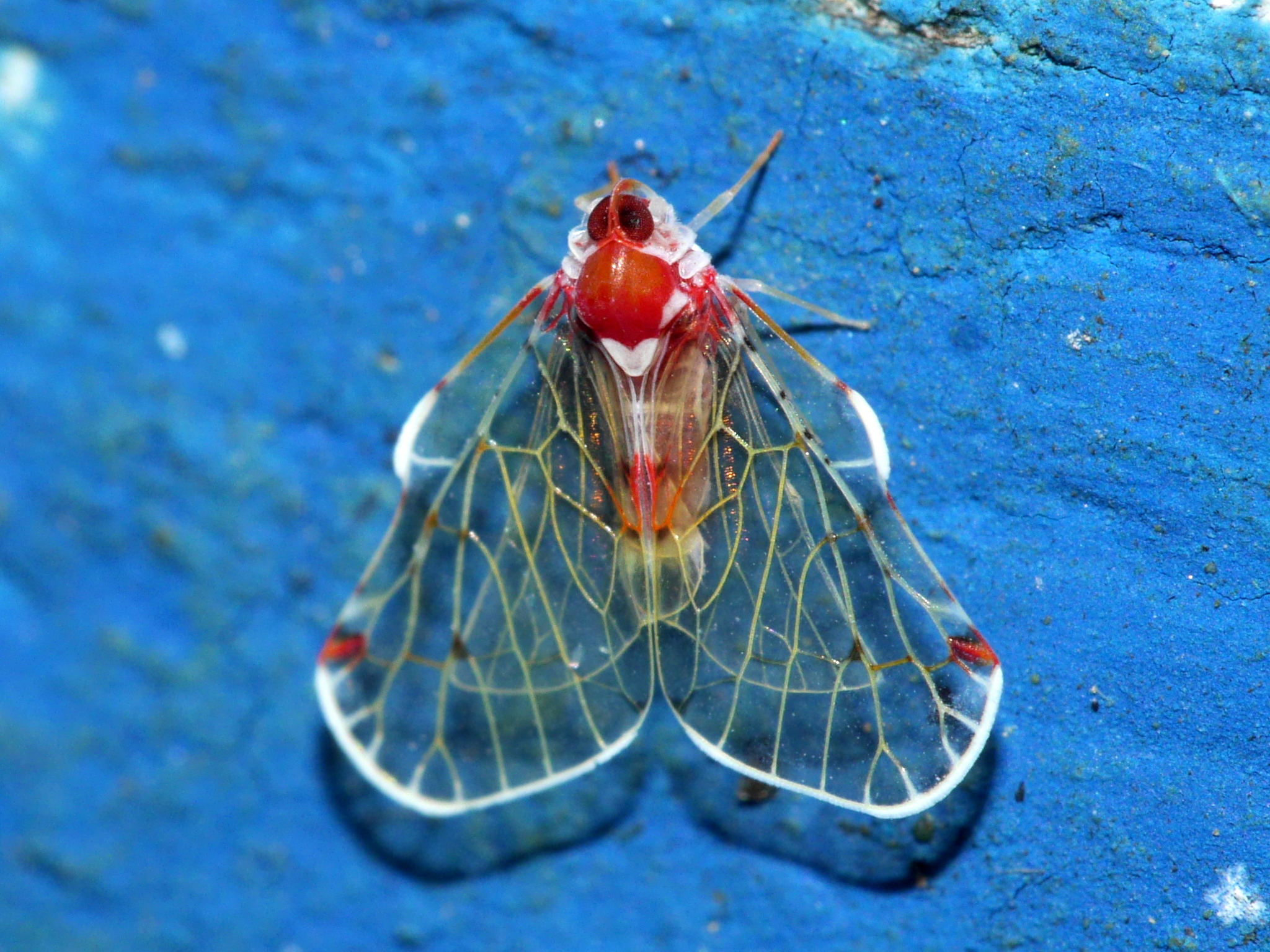
- A species of Saccharodite (Saccharodite plurima species group)

Scientific classification
- Kingdom: Animalia
- Phylum: Arthropoda
- Clade: Pancrustacea
- Class: Insecta
- Order: Hemiptera
- Suborder: Auchenorrhyncha
- Infraorder: Fulgoromorpha
- Family: Derbidae
- Subfamily: Otiocerinae
- Tribe: Rhotanini
- Genus: Saccharodite; Kirkaldy, 1907

Synonyms
- Muiralyricen Metcalf, 1946; Malpa Metcalf, 1954

= Saccharodite =

Genus of planthoppers

Saccharodite is a large genus of planthoppers from the family Derbidae, tribe Rhotanini, with more than 100 species. The largest number of species have been reported from Borneo, Indonesia, New Guinea, China and the Philippines, but the genus has a much wider distribution, ranging from Sri Lanka in the West, over southern parts of mainland Asia up to southern Japan in the North. Saccharodite is also found in other parts of the western Pacific like Micronesia, Fiji and New Caledonia, up to eastern parts of Australia, in the South as far as Tasmania. The adult hoppers are around 5 mm long from head to the tip of the forewings. They are characterized by their forewing venation. The forewings are usually glassy and bright red marks are common on the head and body, up to most parts except the wings being coloured bright red. When the insects are at rest, the wing surfaces form a common plane like in house flies.

Type species: Saccharodite sanguinea Kirkaldy, 1907 - possible synonym: Saccharodite coccinea (Matsumura, 1940)

== Distribution ==
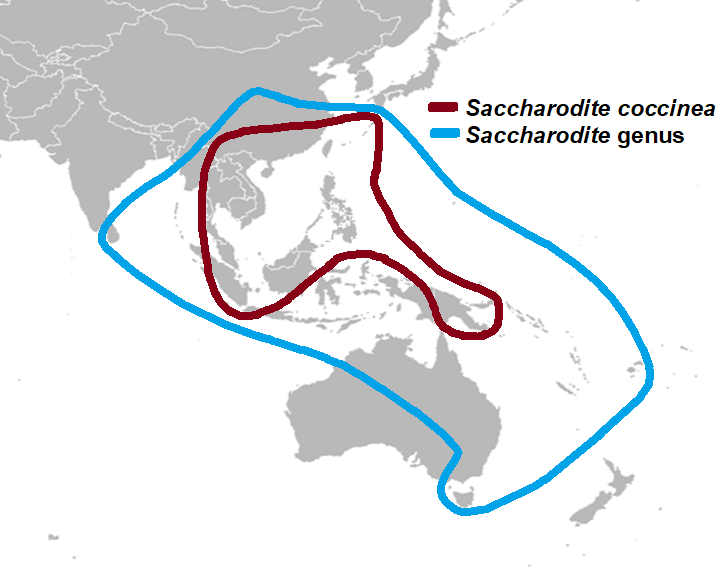
Distribution ranges of the species in the genus Saccharodite (blue outline) and that of Saccharodite coccinea (brown outline) which is possibly a synonym of the type species Saccharodite sanguinea

In the genus Saccharodite, the largest number of species have been reported from the island of Borneo (43 species). The genus is also well represented in New Guinea (26 species), the Philippines (20 species), China (20 species) and remaining parts of Indonesia (10 species). However, the genus has a much wider distribution, ranging from Sri Lanka in the West (2 species), over southern parts of mainland Asia like Myanmar (2 species), western Malaysia (7 species), Thailand (4 species), Laos (3 species), Vietnam (1 species), Taiwan (5 species), and some southern islands of Japan (2 species). In the East and South species of Saccharodite are found in Guam (1 species), Micronesia (4 species), Palau Islands (2 species), Fiji (1 species), the Solomon Isl. (7 species), New Caledonia (6 species) and the northern and eastern parts of Australia (3 species).

== Taxonomy and description ==
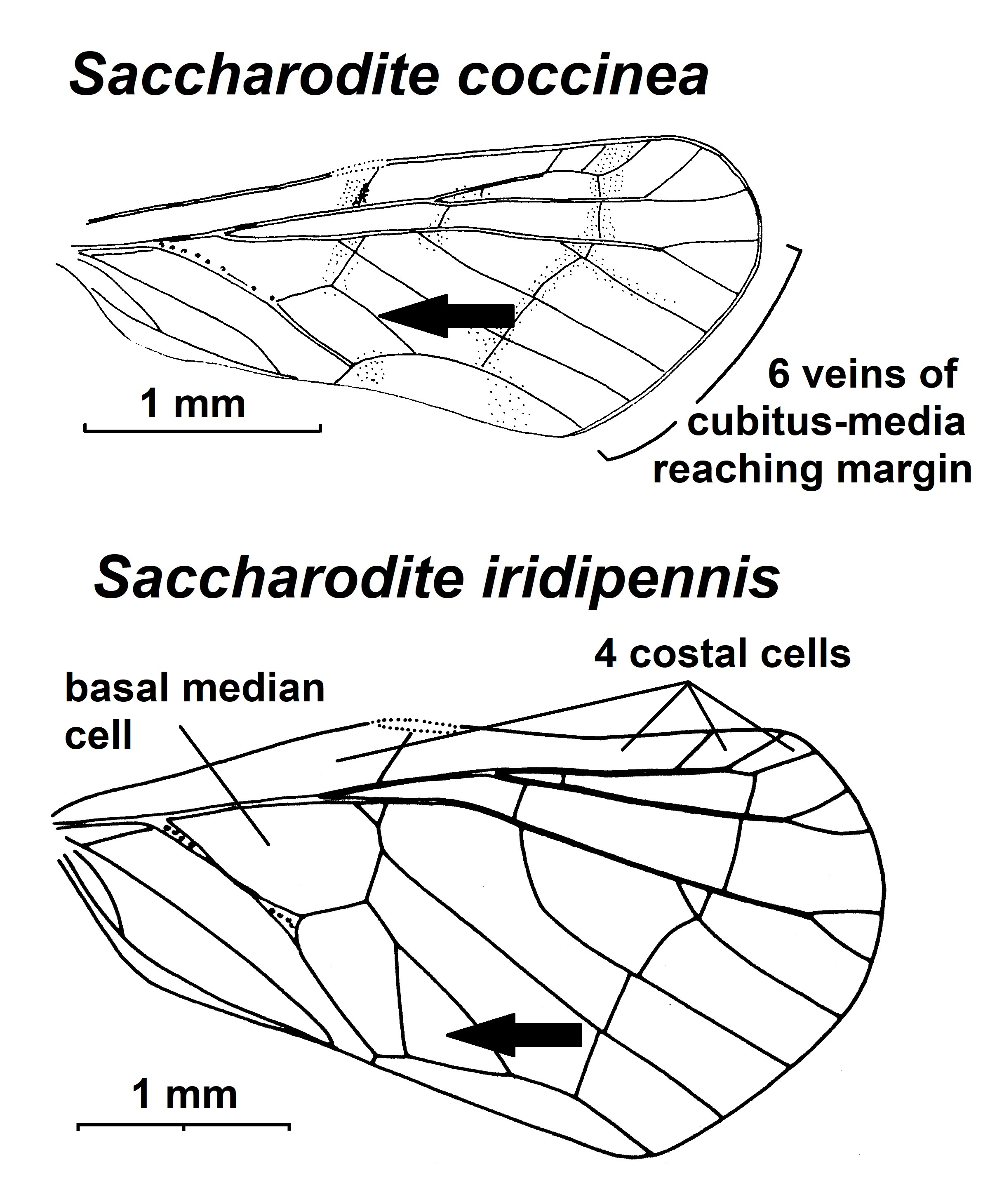
Forewings of Saccharodite coccinea (top) and Saccharodite iridipennis (bottom)

The concept of Saccharodite is based on Kirkaldy's (1907) very short description of the genus and the type species, Saccharodite sanguinea. The original text of the latter in French is: "D'un sanguin brilliant; jambes jaunâtres testacées, teintés de sanguin; élytres hyalines, très faiblement enfumées ça et la, veins incolores, sauf qu'une partie de la ligne sousapicale avec les parties des veins longitudinales immédiatement contigues, sons sanguines." No type specimen of Saccharodite sanguinea has been located and the identity of the type species and the genus remains somewhat uncertain.

No additional species have been assigned to Saccharodite until Fennah re-described the genus in 1969, based on the original description and 2 new species from New Caledonia. In his re-description Fennah refers to the hyaline forewings and the bright red body mentioned by Kirkaldy as diagnostic characters for the type species. Fennah's re-description has been accepted based on the principle of the first reviser.

More important for defining the genus are Fennah's illustrations of the forewing venation of his new species, especially a characteristic triangular cell close to the hind margin of the forewing which is marked by an arrow in the illustration of Saccharodite iridipennis on the left. Like in other genera of Rhotanini, the branch of the media closest to its base splits just after branching off and the inner vein joins a branch of the cubitus anterior to form the basal median cell. However, in Saccharodite, both veins separate again and then join once more, forming the characteristic triangular cell. Both veins fail to separate again in only a few species like in Saccharodite coccinea, see illustration at the beginning of this section, where the joined veins are marked by an arrow. There is another very small triangular cell at the base of the initial branch of the media. The triangular cell near the hind margin of the forewing is unique in the tribe Rhotanini and is the main diagnostic character of the genus in combination with 2 other characters, the 4 costal cells and for most species the 6 veins of the cubitus-media complex reaching the margin at the end of the forewings.

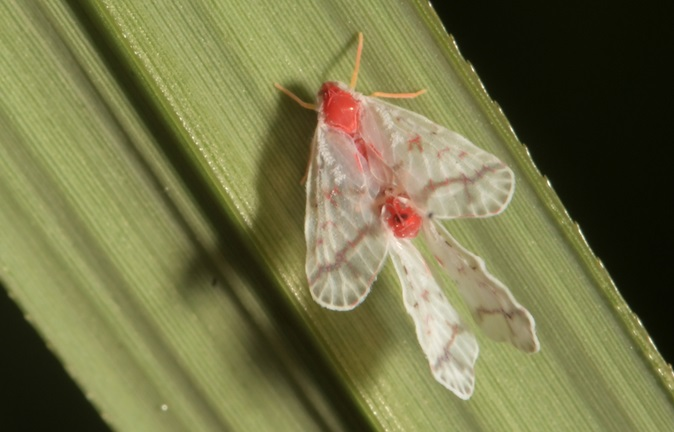
Saccharodie coccinea from Taiwan

Saccharodite coccinea (originally described from Taiwan by Matsumura in 1940 as Rhotana coccinea) has the same features as those described by Kirkaldy for Saccharodite sanguinea and both species may be synonyms. In particular, the blood-red colour of the body and the colouration of the forewing veins match in both descriptions. The type specimen of S. coccinea is also missing, however the species is well defined by the detailed original description. It has a wide distribution range which includes the type locality (Java, Indonesia) of S. sanguinea (see illustration above). However, apart from the unusual forewing venation, it has other characters which are not typical for most species of Saccharodite as defined by Fennah. The forewings are rather elongated, slightly opaque and slightly powdered. In contrast, according to Fennah's re-description, most species of Saccharodite have broader and glassy, unpowdered forewings. These differences contribute to the uncertainty about the taxonomy of this genus.

Bright red marks on the head and the body are common among the species of Saccharodite. For example, the scutellum or even the whole mesonotum might be bright red (see the gallery below and the taxobox on the top right). However, not all species have red marks and it is unusual that most parts of the head and abdomen are blood-red like in S. sanguinea and S. coccinea. The diversity in colouration in the genus is illustrated in the gallery below. In profile, the head is typically evenly rounded, but the junction between vertex and face may be angulated. Like in other genera of Rhotanini, there are ridges on the sides of the vertex and the face, the facial carinae. In frontal view the facial carinae meet at the junction of vertex and face in almost all species of Saccharodite. The size of the species ranges from 4–6.5 mm from head to the end of the forewings. In all species of the genus which have been observed alive, the wings are held in a common plane like house flies.

Diversity of coloration of species in the genus Saccharodite

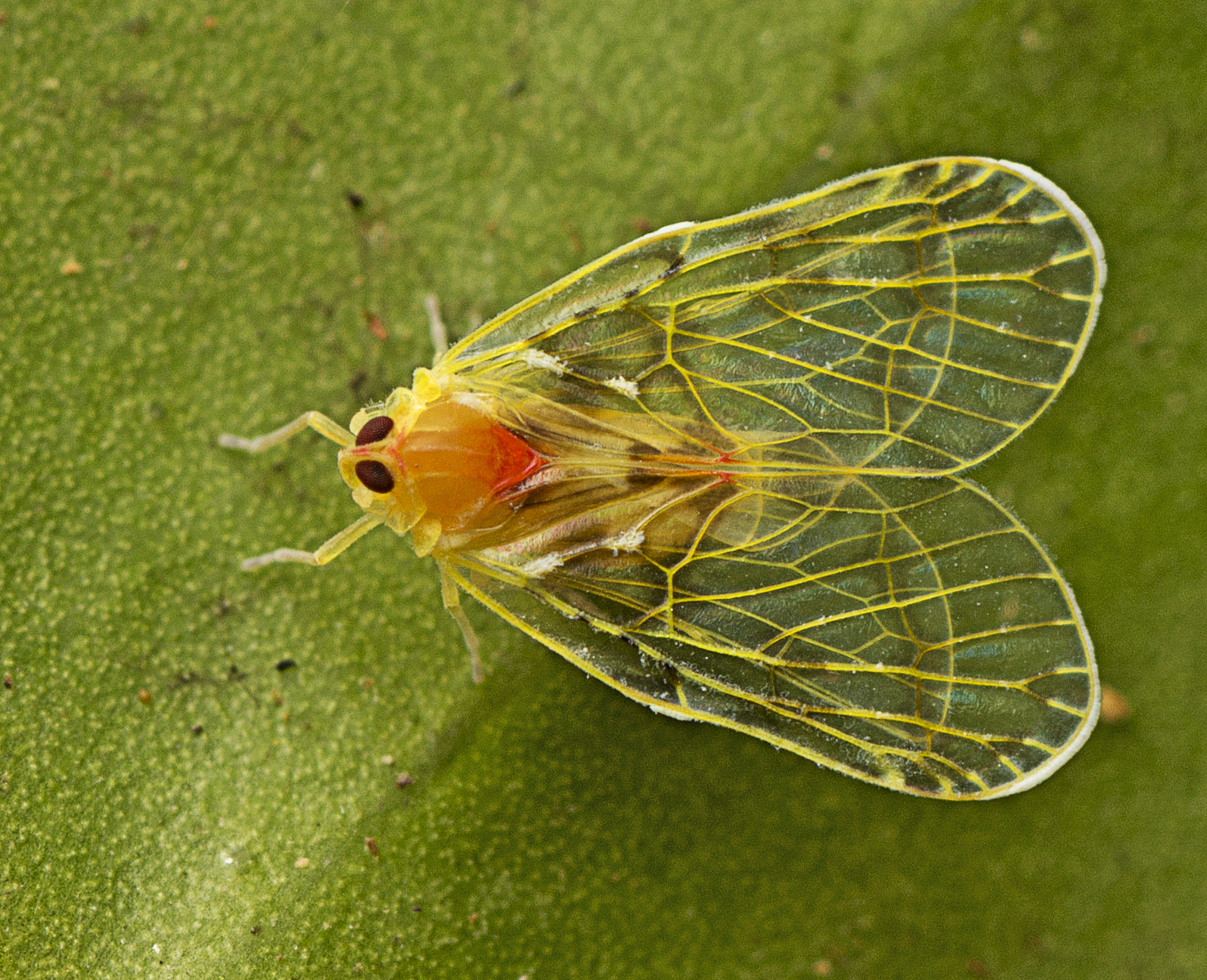
Saccharodite chrysonoe

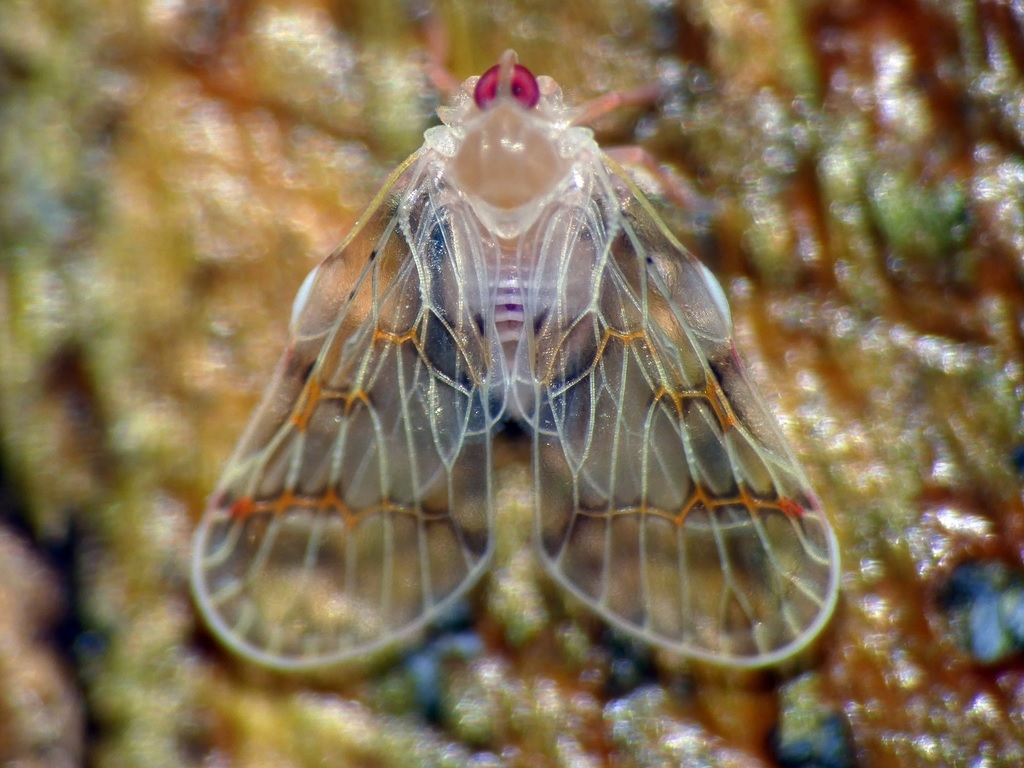
Saccharodite basipunctulata

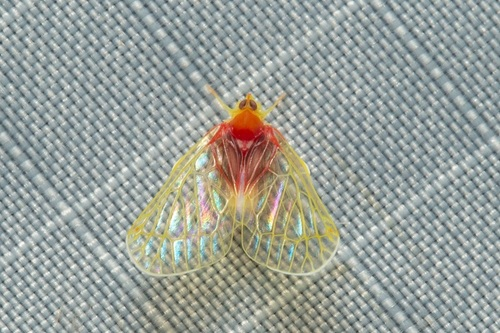
Saccharodite aurora

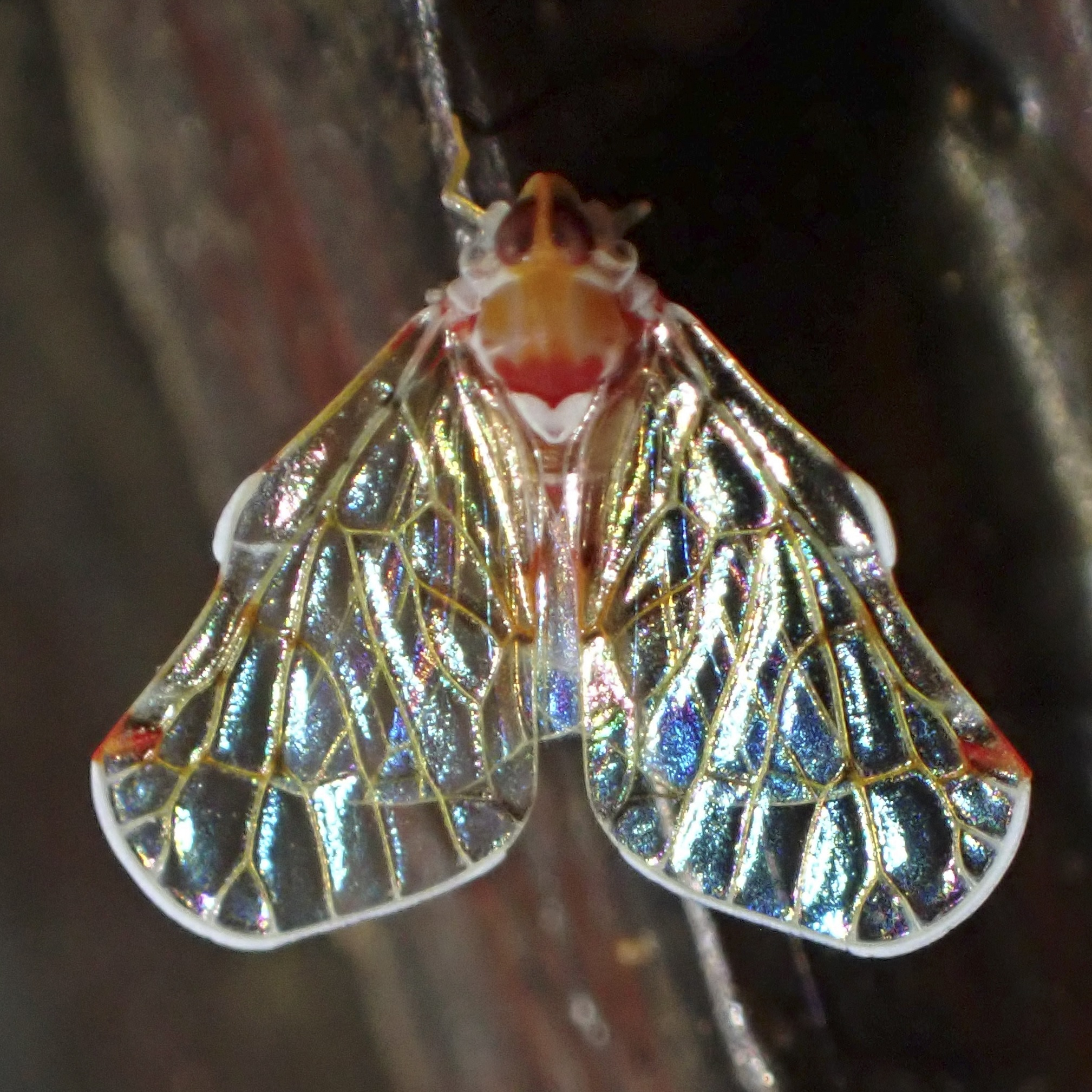
Saccharodite sp. (S. plurima species group)

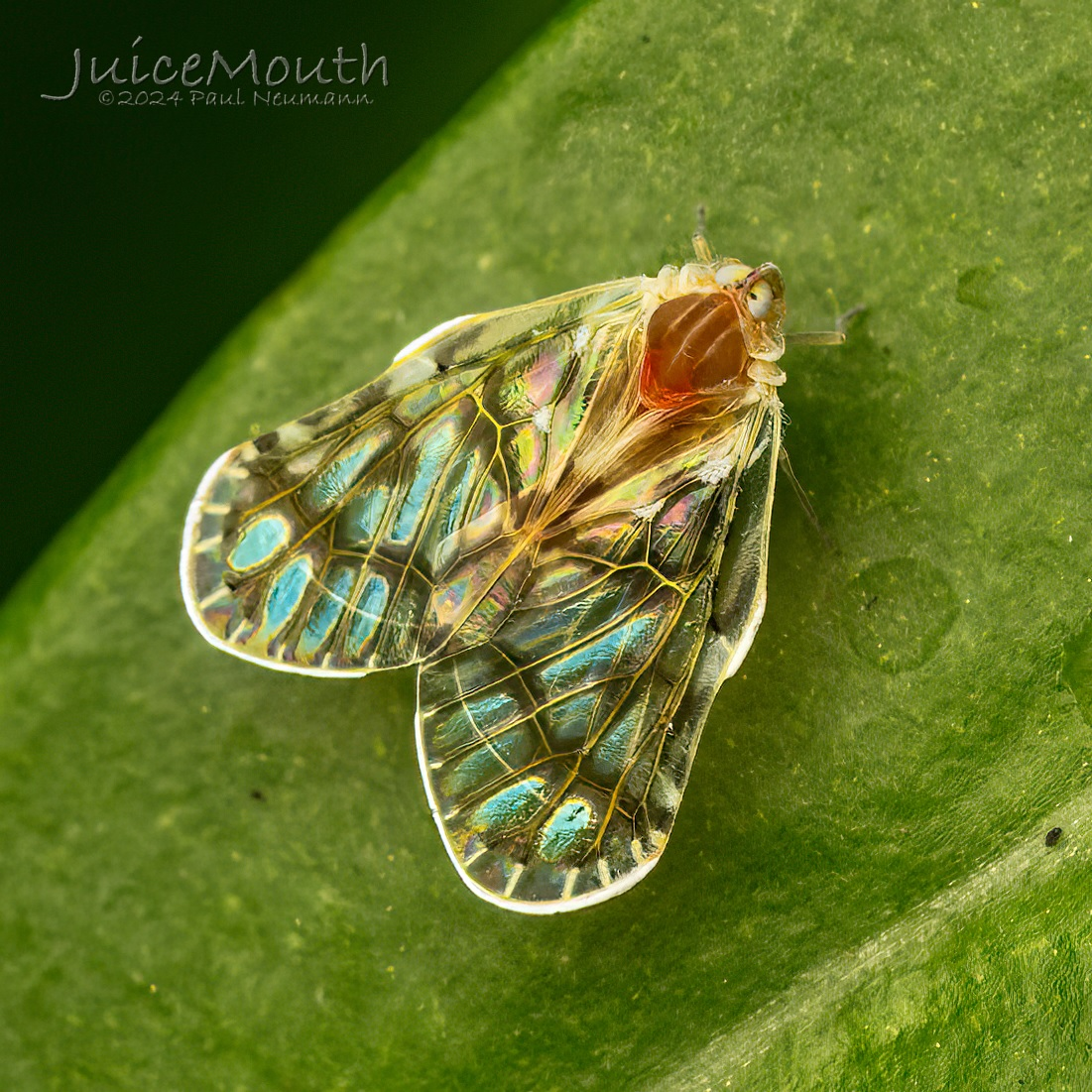
Saccharodite sp. (possibly dark form of S. chrysonoe)

== Biology ==
Like in other genera of the Rhotanini, there is very little information on the biology of the species of Saccharodite. It is assumed that the nymphal stages live in decaying organic matter like other derbids, feeding on fungi. Even information on the host plants the adults feed on is scarce. Several species have been found feeding on coconut and other palms, including Saccharodite coccinea. However, host plant records are rare, even for common species like Saccharodite basipunctulata which has been mainly collected by light traps or malaise traps. In some species it is clear that the adults can be polyphagous, feeding on a variety of plants.

== Species groups ==
A total of 116 species of Saccharodite have been described (as of 2026) and 85 of these have been assigned to 9 species groups as they show obvious similarities in forewing venation, other morphological features and/or colouration. For example, Saccharodite coccinea and Saccharodite sanguinea form one species group. Five other species groups are briefly described below and their main features are illustrated and marked by arrows:

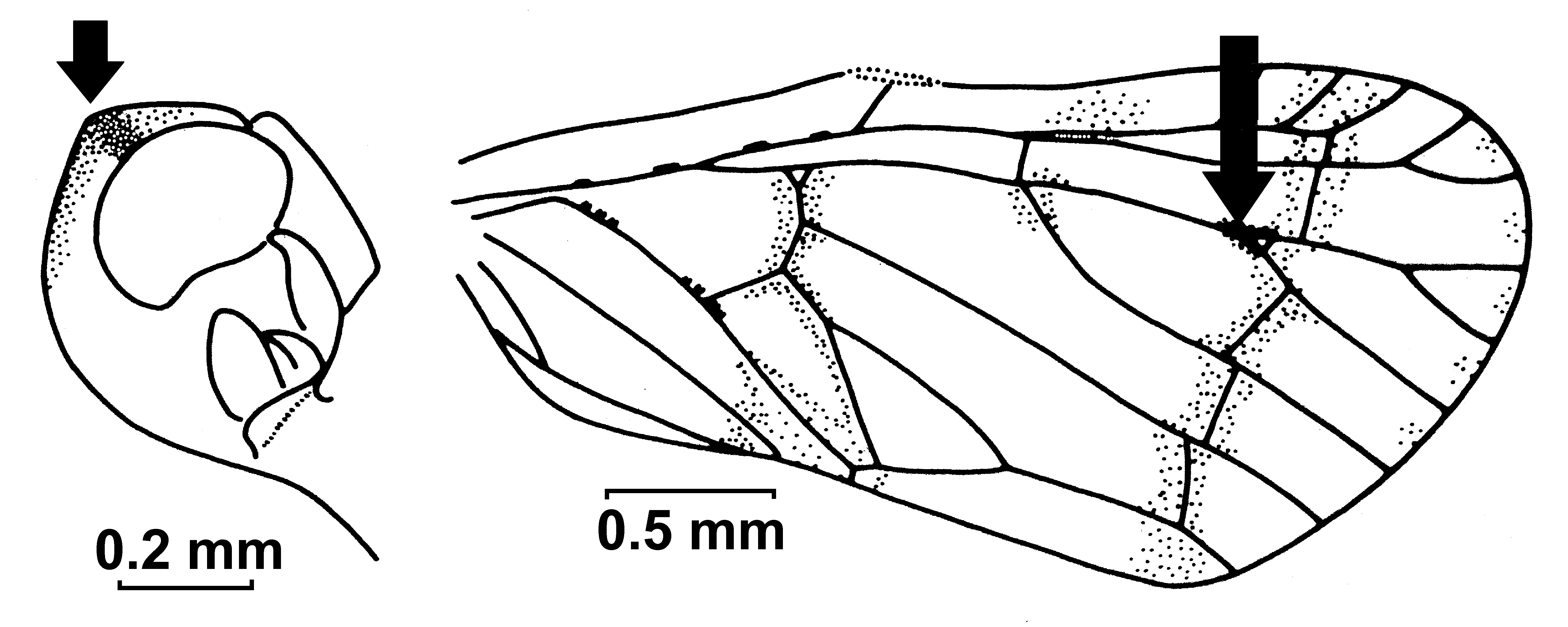
Forewing of Saccharodie foliata, arrow points to a characteristic mark at the base of the third media branch

- Saccharodite foliata species group - This group includes 6 species which are found in Borneo and West Malaysia. They are characterized among others by the head in profile forming an angle at the junction between vertex and face, as well as by a characteristic mark on the forewing at the base of the pre-last branch of the media.

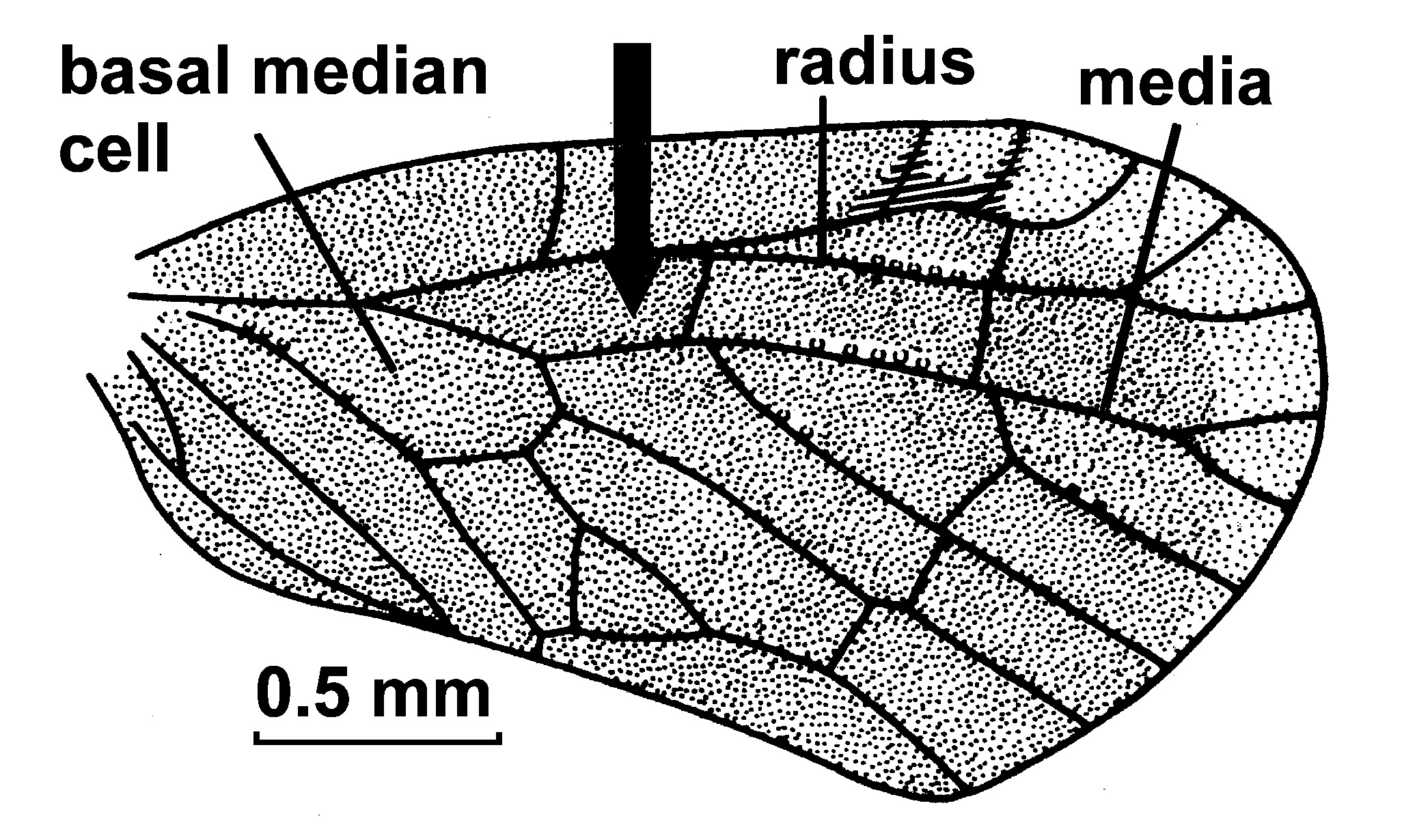
Forewing of Saccharodie guamana, arrow points to a characteristic very broad cell between the bases of radius and media, almost as broad as the basal median cell

- Saccharodite guamana species group - This group includes 22 species and 15 of these have a restricted distribution in New Guinea and the Solomon Islands. The group also includes 3 species found in Guam, Micronesia and Palau, plus one species each in China, Taiwan and the Philippines. Finally, the group also includes Saccharodite basipunctulata (Melichar, 1914), the most common and most widely distributed species in the genus Saccharodite which has a distribution range, extending from Sri Lanka in the West over southern parts of mainland Asia, to Micronesia and the Philiipines in the North and up to Queensland, Australia in the South. The most characteristic feature of the members of the S. guamana species group is a broad cell on the forewing just after the fork of media posterior and the radius (still combined with the subcosta), see the arrow in the illustration on the left. This cell is almost as broad as the basal median cell. Further, the forewings are often slightly powdered and may have a somewhat oval outline.

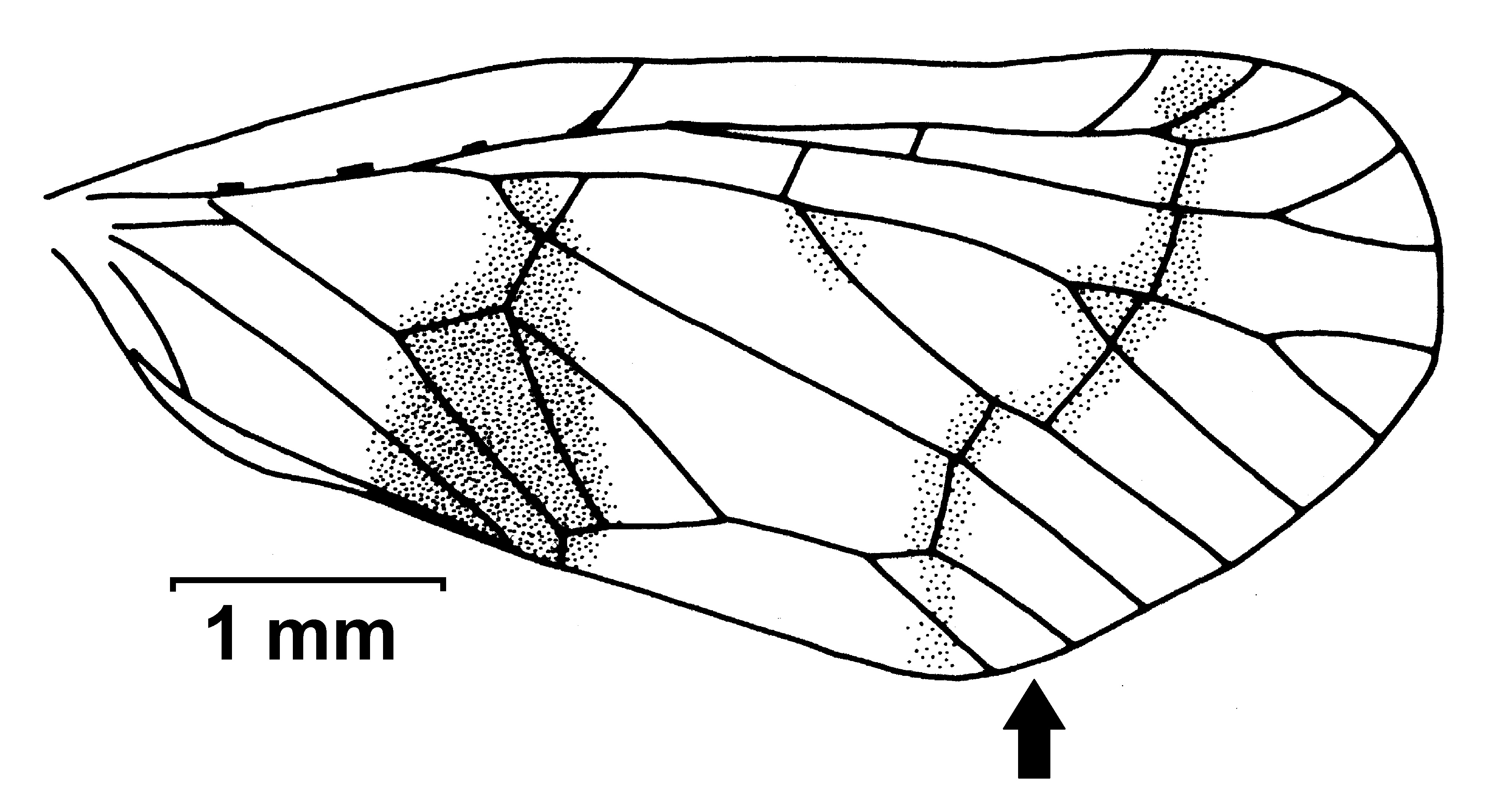
Forewing of Saccharodie matsumurae, arrow points to the separated tips of the cubitus and media branches

- Saccharodite matsumurae species group - This group includes 13 species which are found in Borneo (6 species), the Philippines (3 species), and one species each in Taiwan, southern China, Vietnam and Laos. The main characteristics of this group are the glassy forewings and the veins cubitus anterior and MP_{4} separating again near the wing margin (arrow in illustration at the right), resulting in 7 veins of the cubitus-media complex reaching the margin at the end of the forewing, not 6 veins like in nearly all other Saccharodite species.

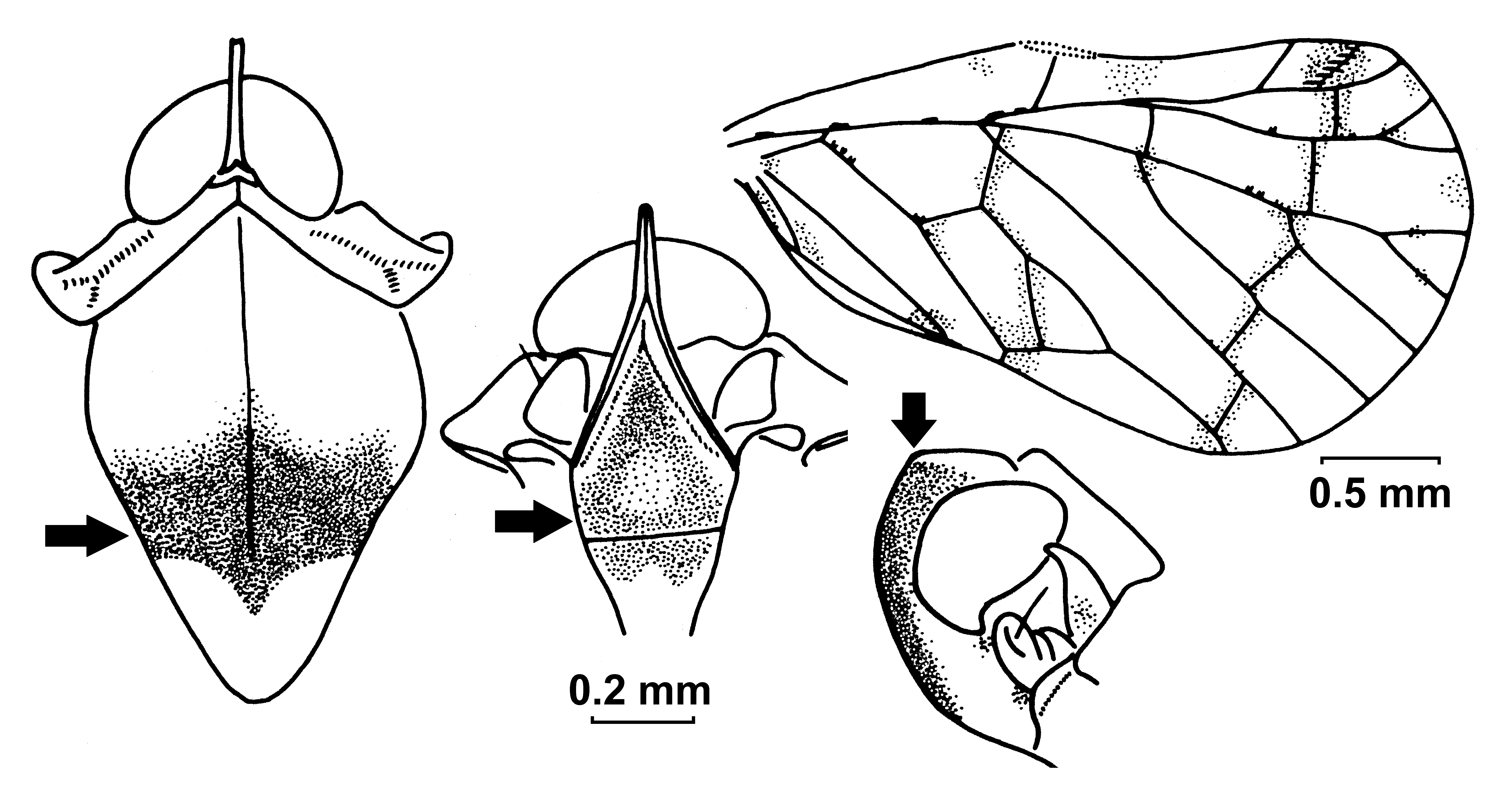
Saccharodie plurima, arrows points to bright red marks on the face and the mesonotum, as well as to the angulated junction between vertex and face

- Saccharodite plurima species group - This group includes 31 species, 23 of which have been reported from Borneo and/or the Philippines. However, others are found as far north as central China and southern Japan. In the south the distribution of this group extends up to New Caledonia. Several species have a wider distribution like Saccharodite kagoshimana (Matsumura, 1914) which has been recorded from southern Japan to mainland Asia (Myanmar, West Malaysia and China) and to Indonesia. The members of this group are characterized by an angulated profile of the head at the junction between vertex and face, glassy forewings with the standard venation and bright red marks on the face and the mesonotum, see the gallery and the taxobox above (sometimes nearly the whole mesonotum is bright red).

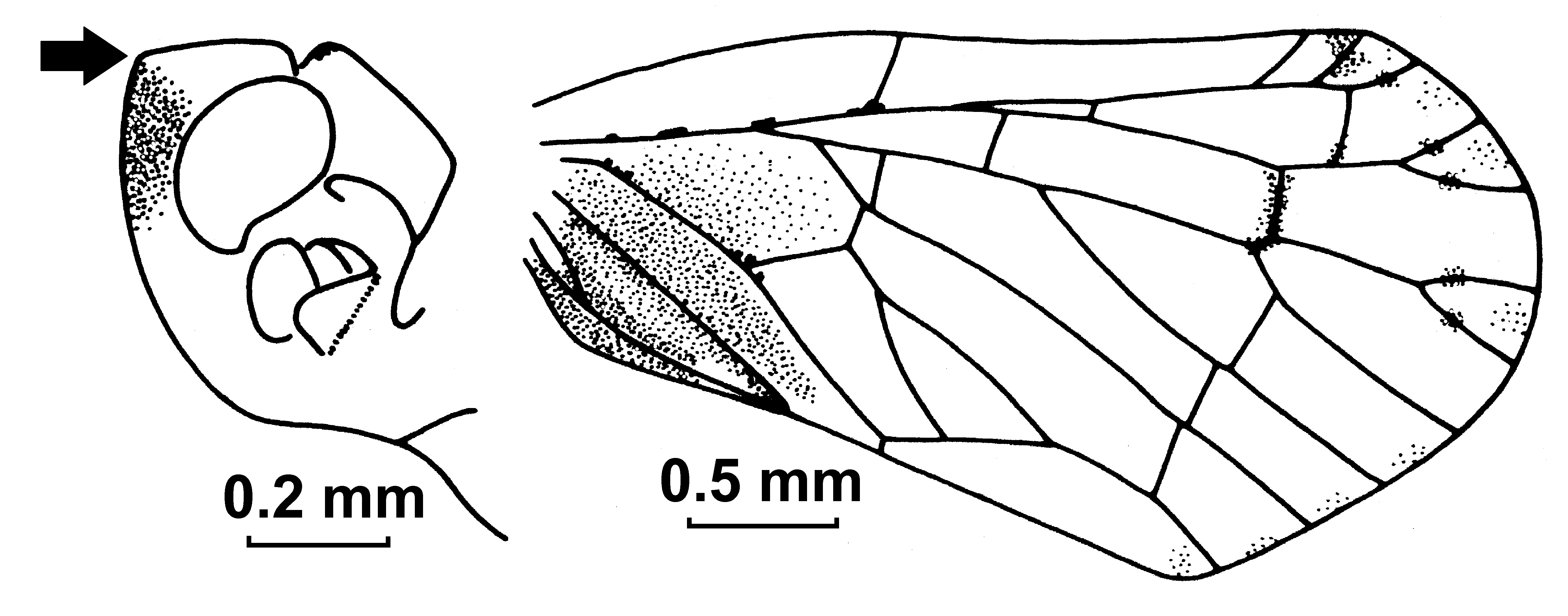
Forewing of Saccharodie gagnei, arrow points to the angulated junction between vertex and face on the head

- Saccharodite thia species group - This group includes 5 species, with 2 each found in Borneo and New Caledonia and 1 in Fiji. The members can be easily recognized by the head having a strongly angulated profile, forming an angle of almost 90° at the junction between vertex and face. The forewings have the typical venation for the genus Saccharodite, but are rather narrow with a somewhat oval outline.

Like for other genera in the tribe Rhotanini, most species of Saccharodite are uncommon or rare. The most common and most widespread species is Saccharodite basipunctulata (Melichar 1914) which was originally described from the Philippines but occurs from Sri Lanka to China, to Micronesia, to Australia. For all Saccharodite species as of 2026 see the complete, alphabetical list of species.
