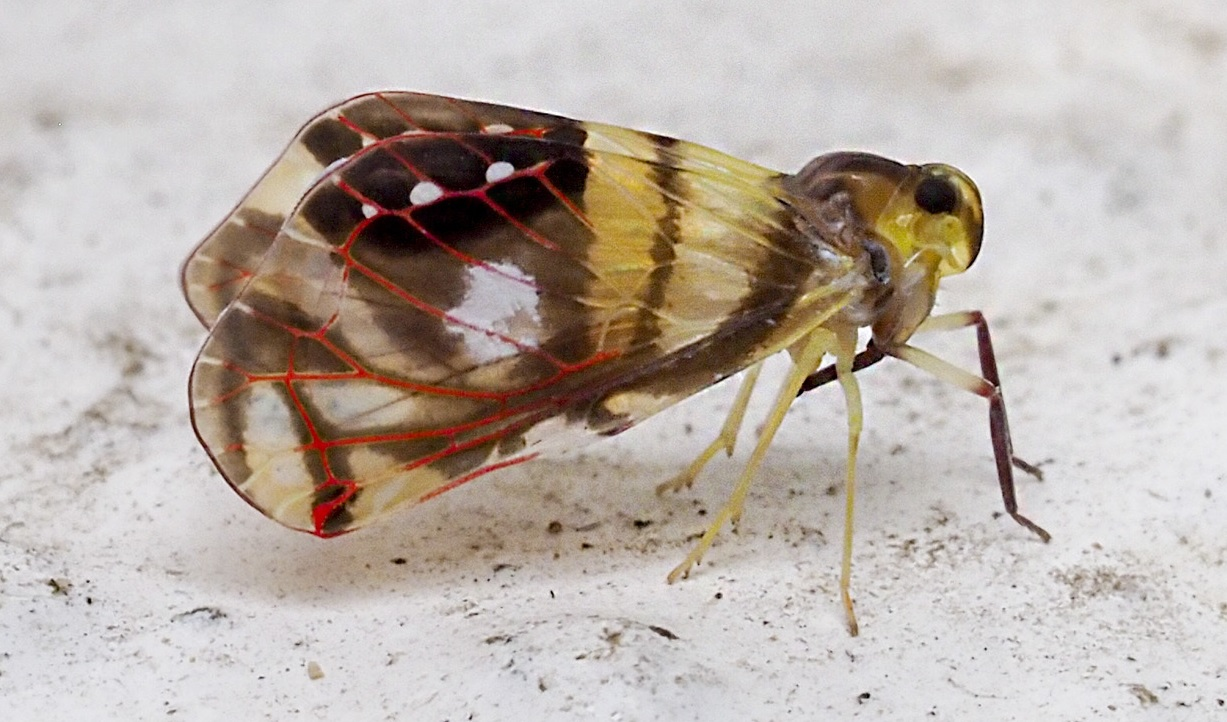
- Rhotana marmorata

Scientific classification
- Kingdom: Animalia
- Phylum: Arthropoda
- Clade: Pancrustacea
- Class: Insecta
- Order: Hemiptera
- Suborder: Auchenorrhyncha
- Infraorder: Fulgoromorpha
- Family: Derbidae
- Subfamily: Otiocerinae
- Tribe: Rhotanini; Muir, 1918

= Rhotanini =

Tribe of true bugs

The Rhotanini is a group (tribe) of planthoppers in the family Derbidae. They are found mainly in countries of south-eastern Asia like Malaysia, the Philippines, Indonesia and Papua New Guinea. They are characterized by their small size (around 4–5 mm in length), their broad forewings, the vein pattern on their wings, and a simple head structure. More than 300 species have been described (as of 2026). Like in other derbids, the adults suck the sap of plants while the nymphs live mainly in decaying organic matter.

Type species: Rhotana latipennis Walker, 1857

== Distribution ==
The species of Rhotanini are predominantly tropical insects, living for example in the rainforests of south-eastern Asia where members from all genera can be found. The largest number of species has been reported from Indonesia (34 species), Papua New Guinea (70 species), the Philippines (52 species) and China (51 species). The tribe is also known from other parts of Asia, ranging from India (2 species) and Sri Lanka (10 species) in the West to southern parts of Japan (4 species) in the East. Further, Rhotanini have been reported from parts of Australia (12 species) and islands of the central and western Pacific like the Solomon Islands (17 species) or Micronesia (9 species). An isolated pocket of 5 species from the genus Muiralevu also occurs in parts of West Africa. However, other members of that genus can be found in south-eastern Asia (Indonesia, Borneo, the Philippines, China and Taiwan).

== Description and biology ==
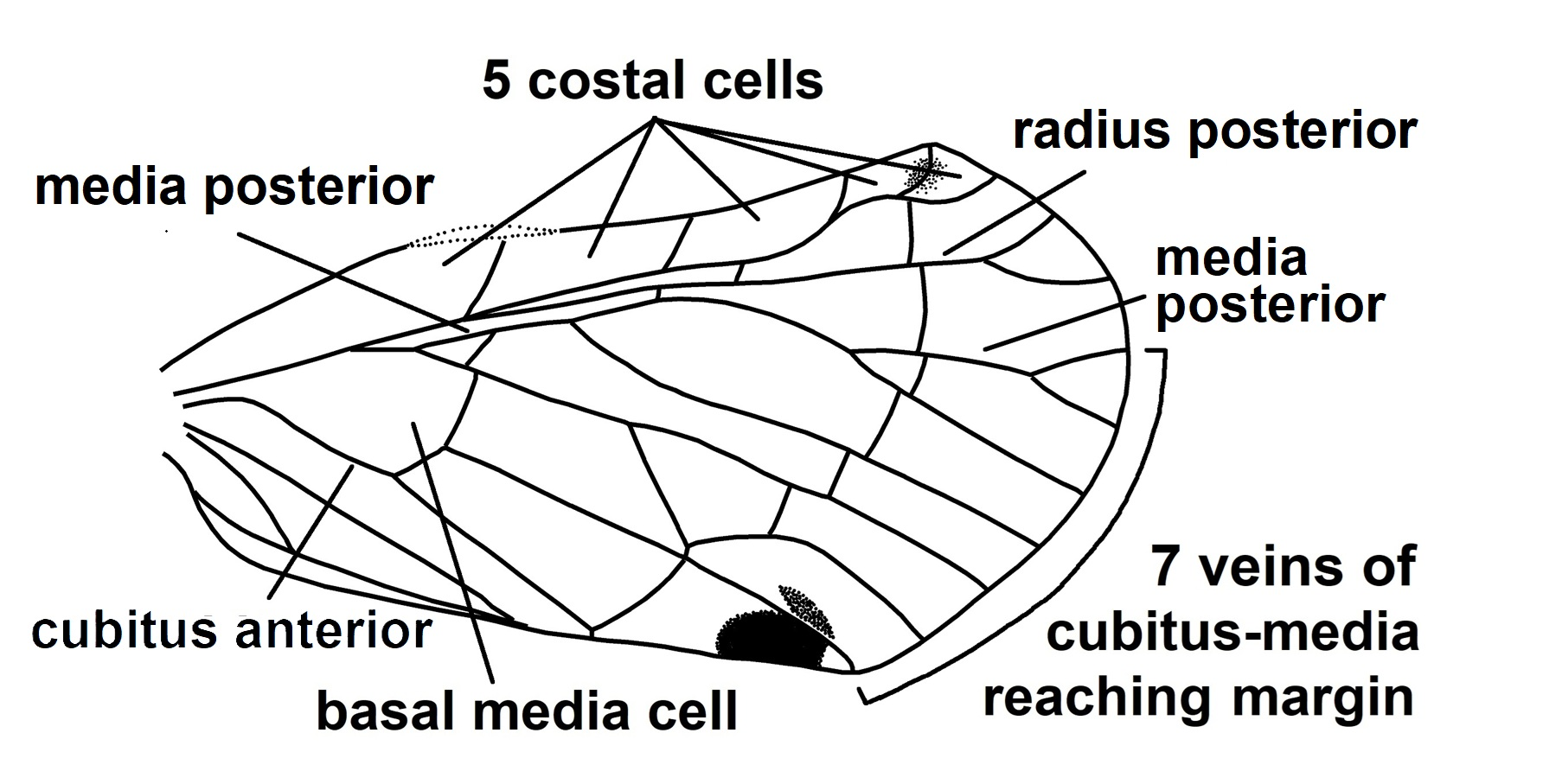
Rhotana maculata forewing - illustration of typical vein pattern of the tribe Rhotanini

The tribe Rhotanini was proposed by Frederick Muir, a British entomologist, in 1918. The tribe is based on the venation of the forewings where the base of the cubitus anterior and the branch of the media posterior closest to its base are connected forming an angular cell. This vein pattern is illustrated on the left for Rhotana maculata, a species very similar to the type species R. latipennis. Here the angular cell described by Muir is called "basal median cell" and is formed by a cross vein between the cubitus anterior and the base of the media posterior branch. The basal median cell is always confined to the basal third of the forewing.

Compared to other Derbidae, the forewings of Rhotanini are broad, the media always has 4 branches, there are 5 or 4 costal cells, and 6 or 7 veins of the cubitus-media complex reach the margin at the end of the wing. The radius has 1 branch, and the branch of the media closest to its base branches again in all genera except in the genus Sumangala. The shape of the forewings can vary from almost oval in the genera Rhotanella and Alara to a shape where the wings widen distinctly towards the tip like in the genera Rhotana and Saccharodite. The forewings are often glassy, but may be covered with powder like in the genus Dichotropis. In some species, especially in the genus Rhotana the forewings might have elaborate colour patterns. When the insect are at rest, the wings are either carried in a roof-like (tectiform) position, or the surfaces of both forewings form a common plane, like in house flies.

The Rhotanini are small derbids, ranging in size from about 3 mm to around 6 mm from the head to the tip of the forewings. Typically, their length is between 4 and 5 mm. Apart from the shape and the venation of the forewings, other features of the Rhotanini include: The head has a simple structure being in profile usually evenly rounded with two short, foliar ridges in front (facial carinae) which often meet at their base. The antennae are short and simple and under each antenna is a well developed subantennal process. The hindwings are often almost as long as the forewings, but at least surpass half the length of the forewing. The hindwings always have a stridulation plate at the hind margin which can be large, like in the genus Alara. The diversity of forms and colours in this tribe is illustrated in the gallery below.

Muir originally placed 4 genera in the Rhotanini (Decora, Levu, Rhotana and Sumangala). However, over the years, various other genera have been described and assigned to the Rhotanini. The separation of these genera was not always clear and currently (as of 2026) only 8 genera are recognised as listed below.

As for other groups of Derbidae, little is known about the biology of the Rhotanini. They have been collected from a variety of plants and can be common on coconut palms. The nymphal stages of some species have been collected from rotting wood and decaying palm fronds, where they probably feed on fungi.

Diversity of wing patterns, wing positions and colours in the tribe Rhotanini

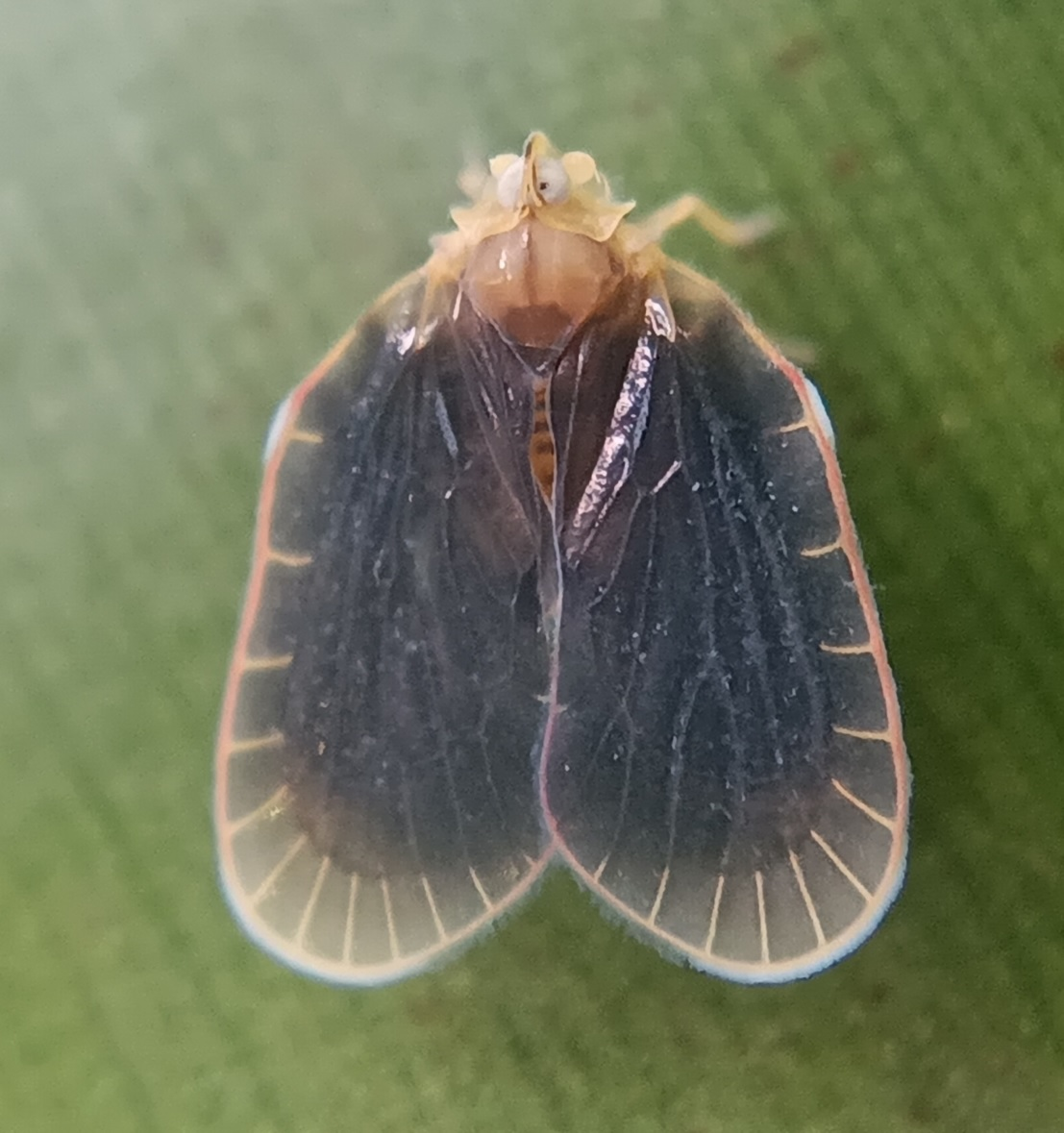
Alara sp., possibly Alara isabella

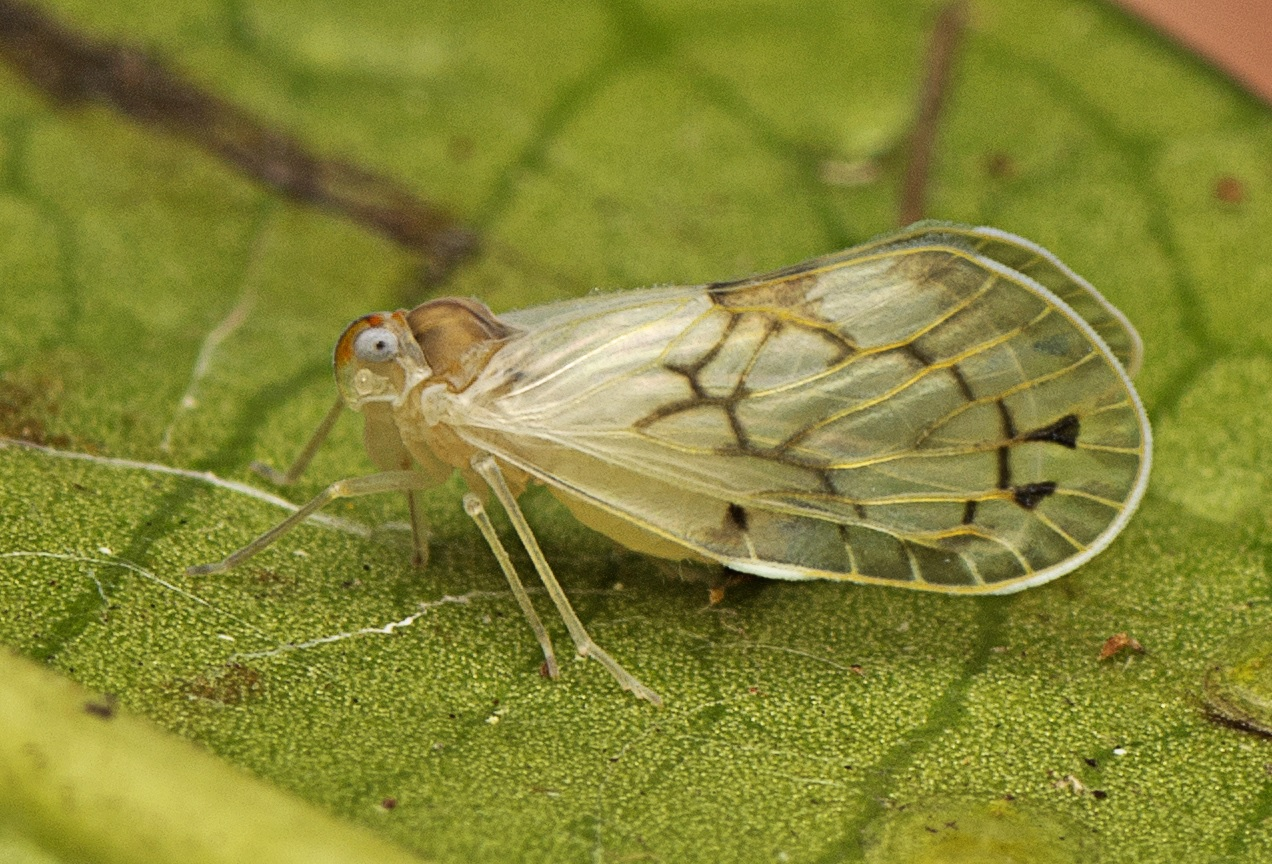
Levu vitiensis

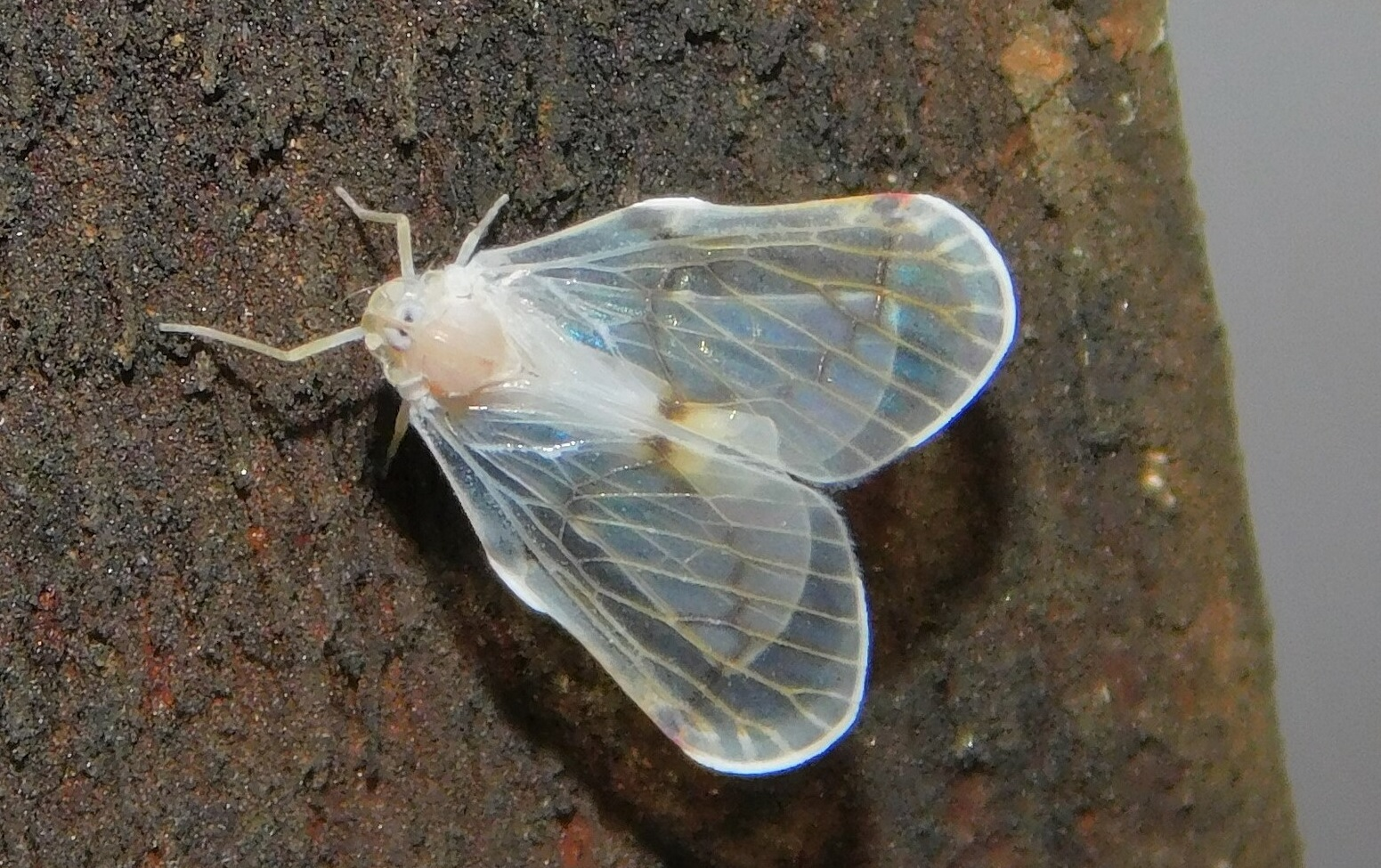
Muiralevu sp.

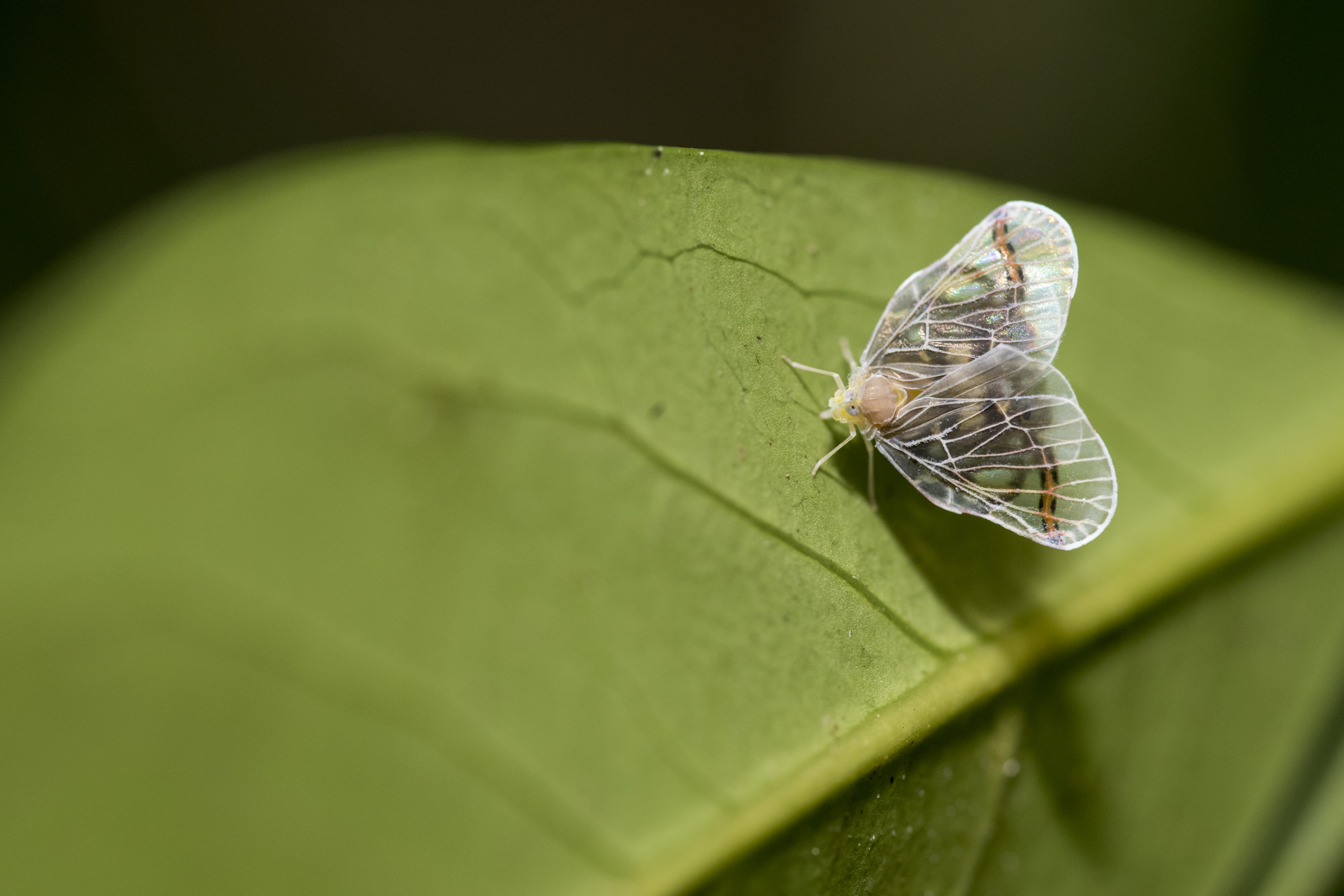
Rhotana obaerata

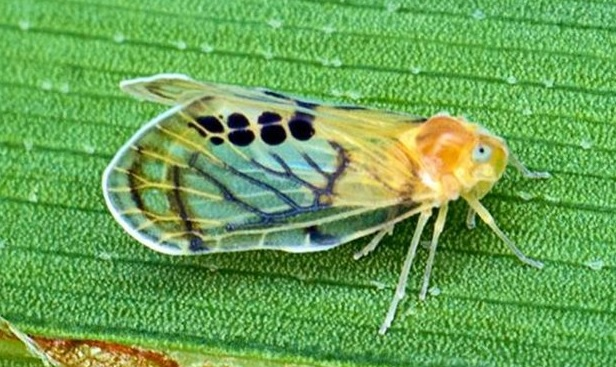
Rhotana gressittorum

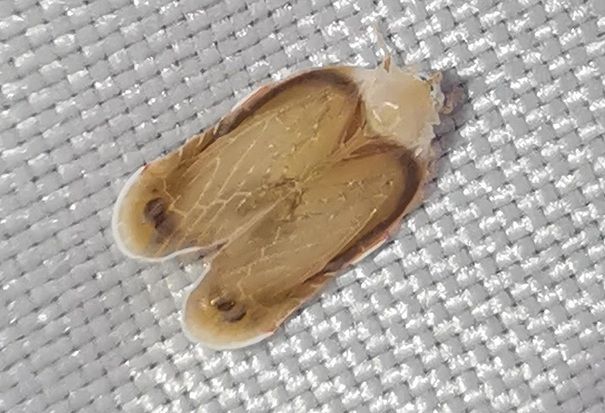
Rhotanella lucida

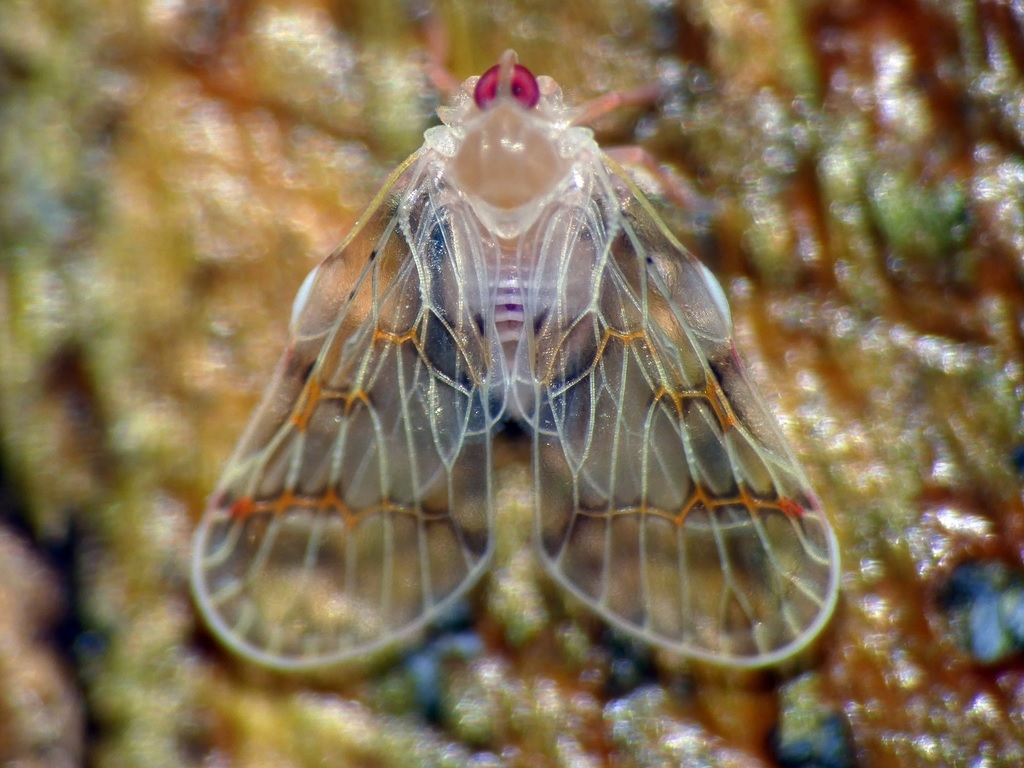
Saccharodite basipunctulata

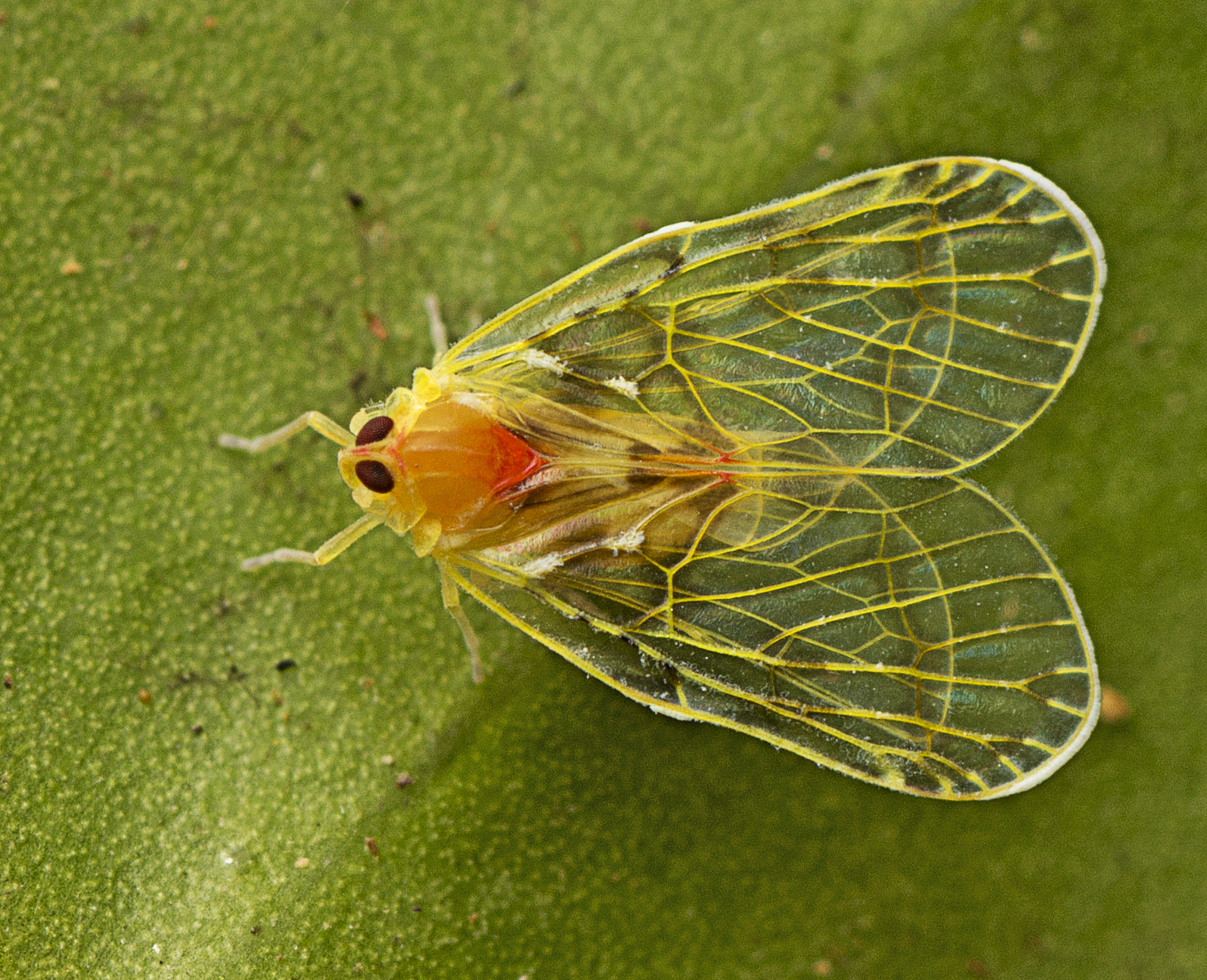
Saccharodite chrysonoe

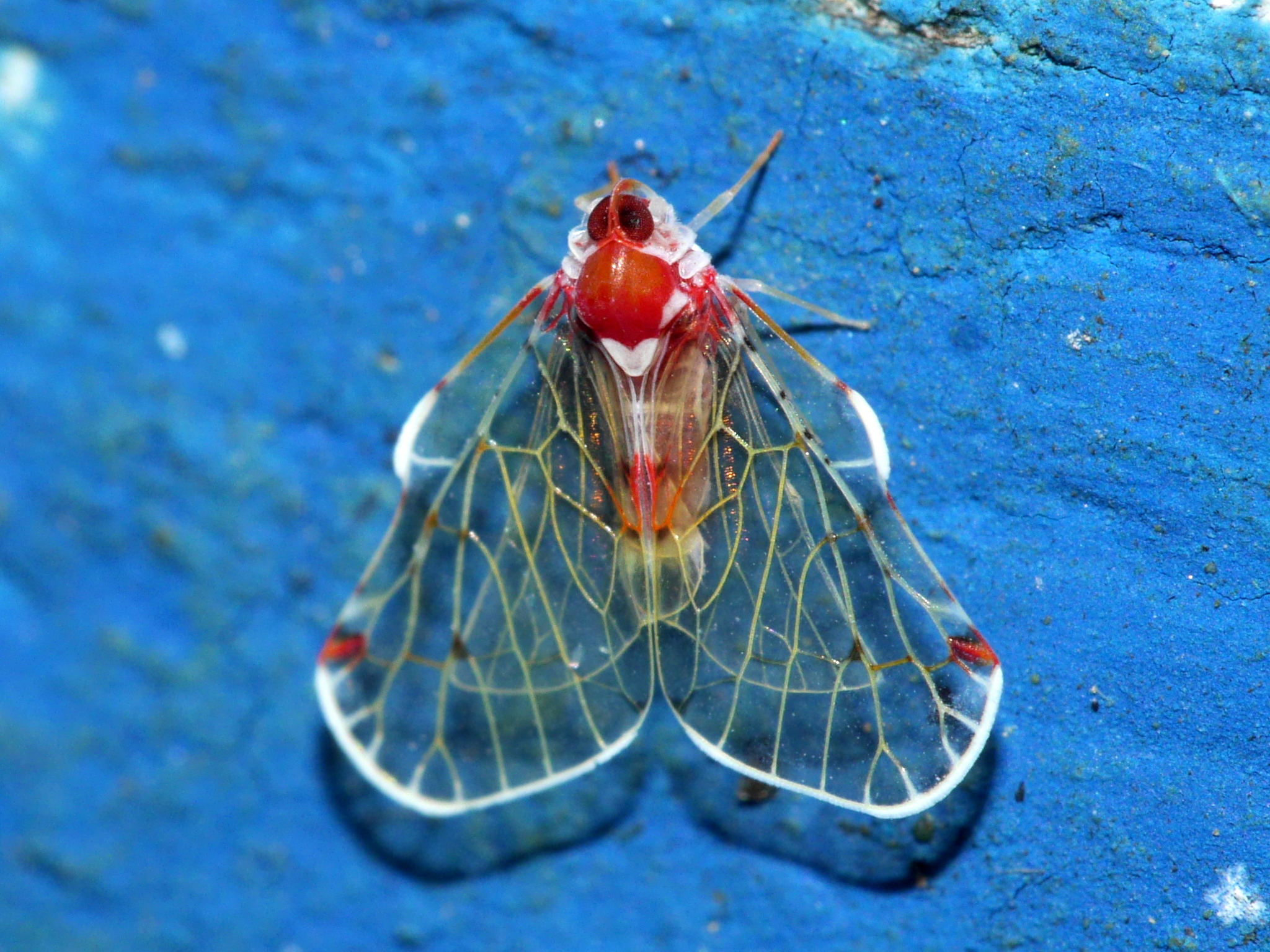
Saccharodite sp. from the S. plurima species group

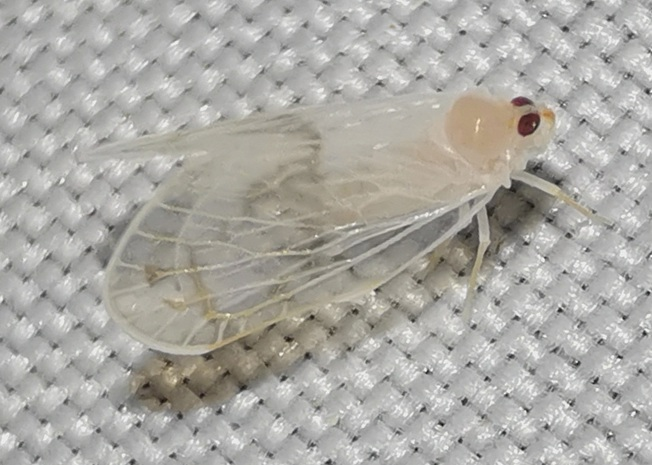
Sumangala sufflava

== Genera ==
The current generic concept of the Rhotanini is based on the venation of the forewings and is related to the distribution of the species. For example, the genus Levu is mainly restricted to the Pacific islands and to eastern Australia, and all African species belong to the genus Muiralevu. Still, there are several taxonomic problems and questions, especially in the genera Rhotana and Saccharodite, and a comprehensive DNA analysis of the Rhotanini would be highly desirable to support and if necessary revise the generic concept of this tribe. The 8 genera of the Rhotanini are briefly described below.

=== Genus Alara Distant 1911 ===
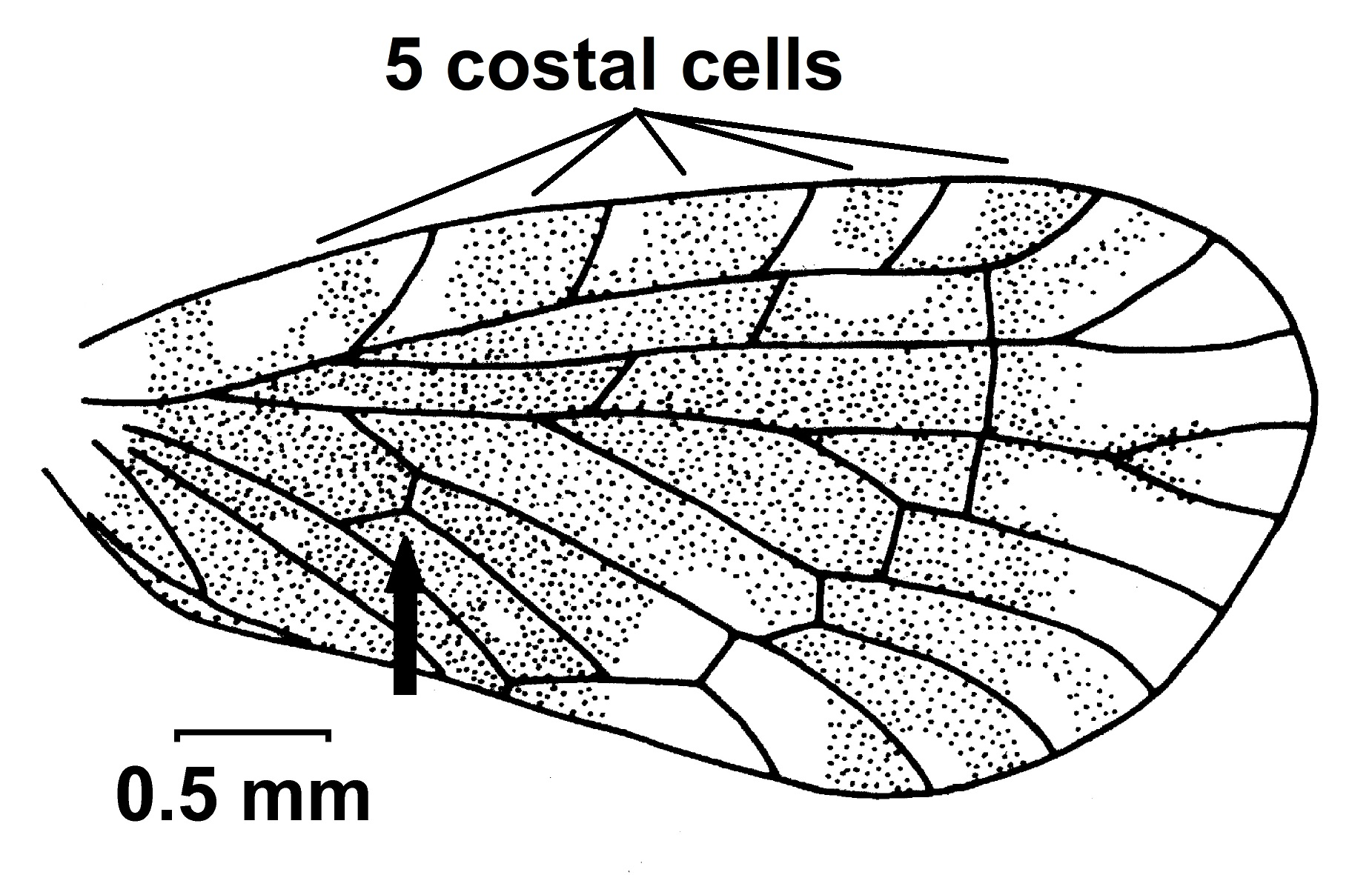
forewing of Alara dux

Species of Alara are characterised by the forewings having 5 costal cells which gradually decrease in size from the base to the tip of the wings. When the insects are at rest, the surfaces of the wings form a common plane like in house flies. The forewings are often dark brown. Compared to other species of Rhotanini, the hindwings are unusually short and narrow and have a large stridulation plate. The rostrum is very long and usually reaches the middle of the abdomen. The species of Alara are widely distributed in tropical parts of southern Asia and in neighbouring islands, up to northern Australia.

=== Genus Dichotropis Muir 1913 ===
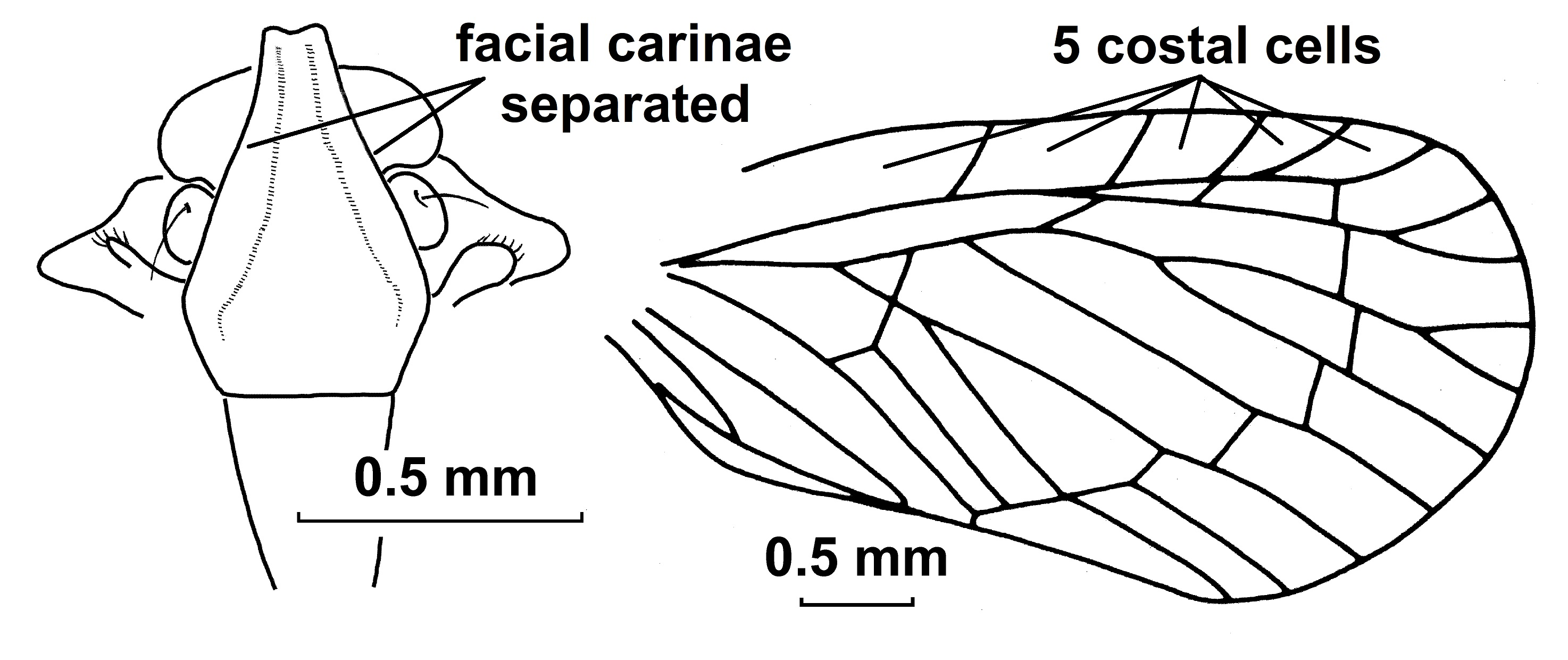
head of Dichotropis amboinensis (left) and forewing of Dicotropis straatmani (right)

Dichotropis is a small genus of Rhotanini, found mainly on the island of New Guinea and neighbouring islands. The 9 species which have been described as of 2026 all occur there, but 3 of them have been also reported from other regions. The species of Dichotropis can be easily recognized by the broad, white forewings which are covered by powder and the separated facial carinae which never meet (see illustration at right). The wing venation is similar to that found in the genus Rhotana and the wings are carried in a roof-like position when the insects are at rest.

=== Genus Levu Kirkaldy 1906 ===
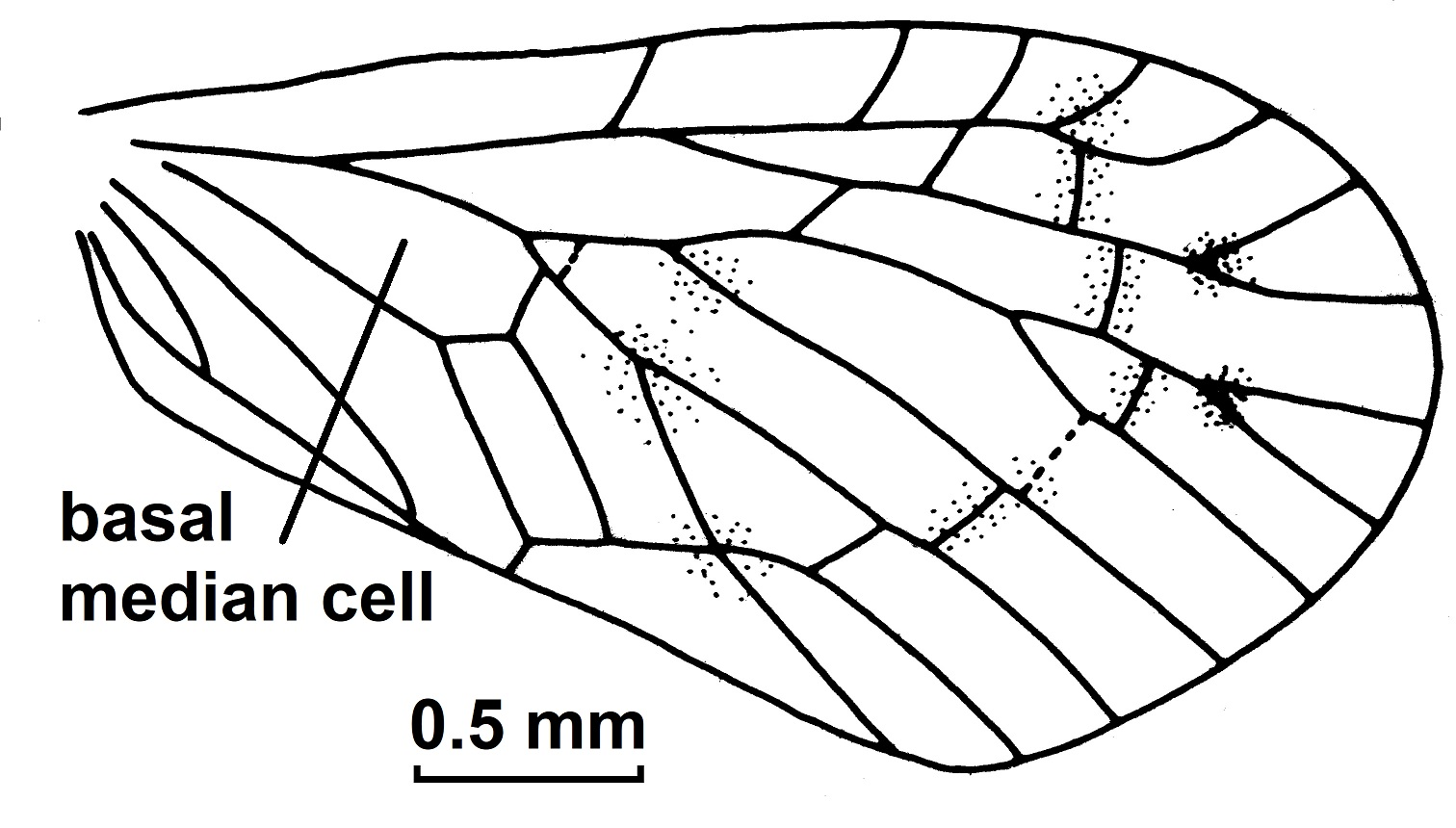
forewing of Levu vitiensis

The species of Levu are similar to those in the genus Rhotana. However, in Levu, the species are smaller and the wings usually have a narrower basal median cell. The forewings are not glassy and may be slightly powdered. They lack the colour patterns often found in Rhotana. In some species, the forewings are held in a roof-like position when the insects are at rest, in others they form a common plane. Species of Levu are mainly found on the islands of the western and central Pacific, including Papua New Guinea, Indonesia, the Philippines and Taiwan. A few species have been also reported from the Asian mainland and from eastern parts of Australia.

=== Genus Muiralevu Zelazny 1981 ===
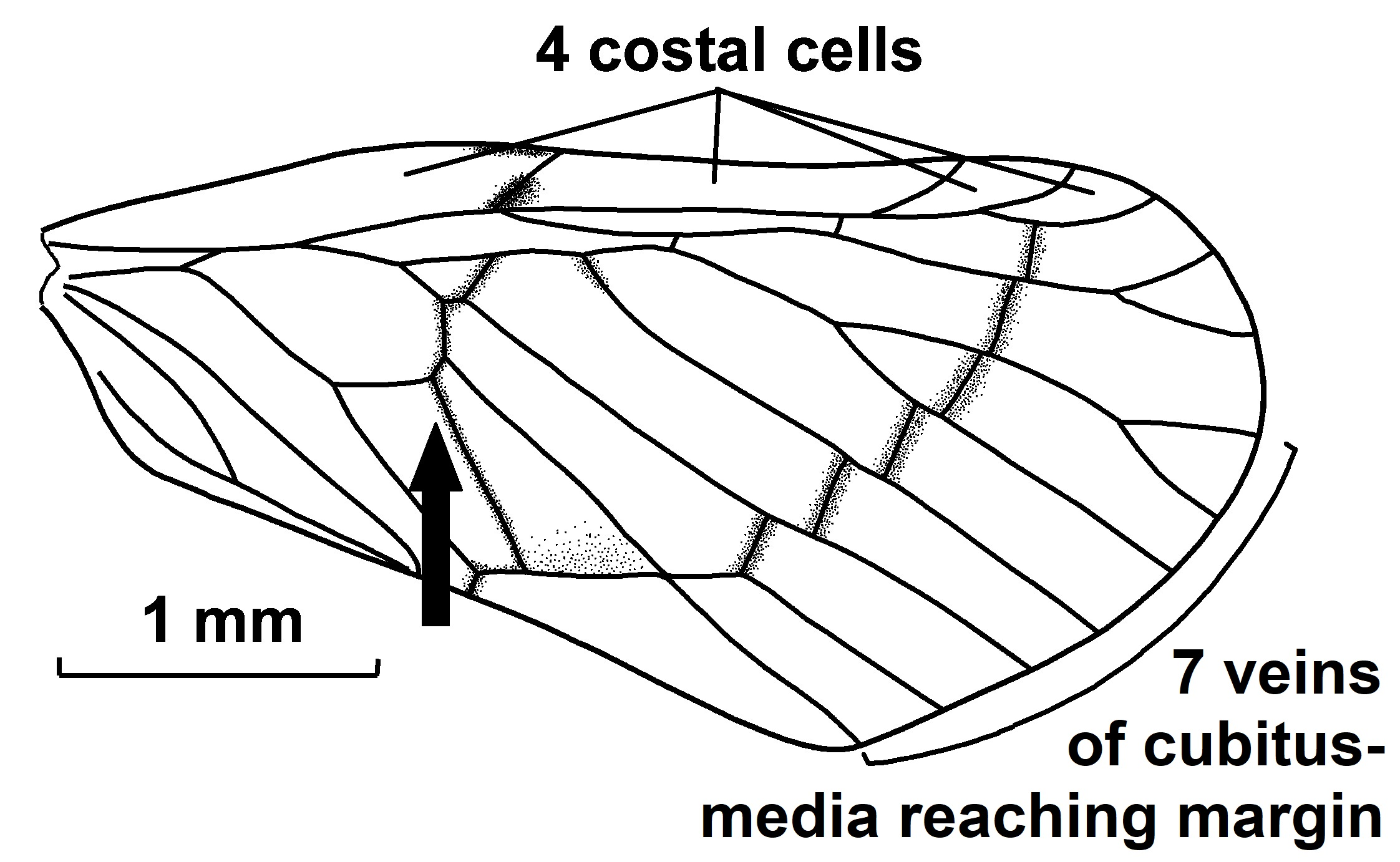
forewing of Muiralevu africanus

The species of Muiralevu can be recognized by the forewings only having 4 costal cells, a feature only shared with the genus Saccharodite. All other genera of the Rhotanini have 5 costal cells. In contrast to the species of Saccharodite, the forewings in Muiralevu are usually more elongated and 7 veins of the cubitus-media complex reach the margin at the end of the wing, only 6 in most species of the genus Saccharodite. Muiralevu is the only genus of the Rhotanini found in Africa from where 5 species have been described. Other species of Muiralevu have been reported from West Malaysia, Borneo, Java, the Philippines, China and Taiwan.

=== Genus Rhotana Walker 1857 ===
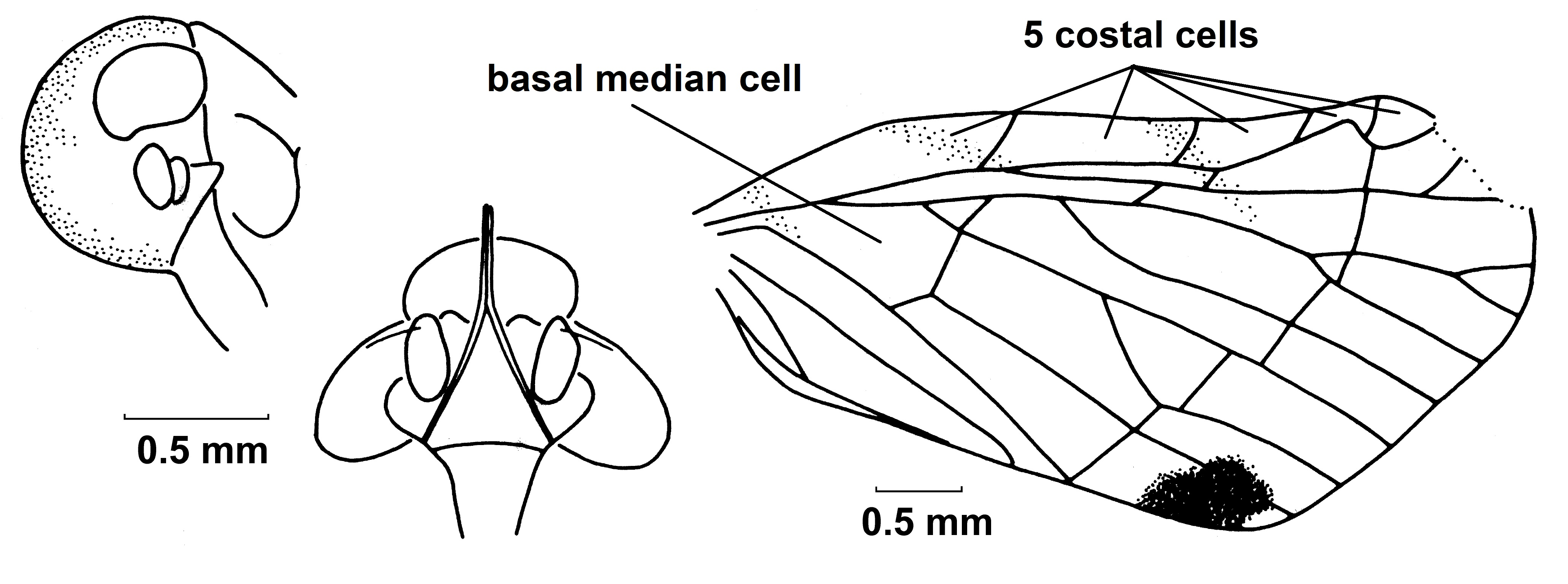
head and forewing of Rhotana latipennis

Rhotana is the type genus of the tribe Rhotanini and includes more than 70 species. These are widely distributed in tropical parts of Asia, parts of Australia and the islands of the western and central Pacific. The head of Rhotana species is evenly rounded in profile with the 2 foliar ridges (facial carinae) usually meeting in front and above the eyes (see illustration at right). In some species, the facial carinae are separated. The forewings have 5 costal cells, a broad basal median cell and 7 veins from the cubitus-media complex reach the margin at the end of the wing. Some of the forewing veins may be dark brown or red. Some species also have black marks on the forewings as well as on the hindwings. The forewings are usually transparent, but patches may be covered with white powder (see Rhotana marmorata in the taxobox above at the top right). The wings may be carried in a roof-like position when the insects are at rest or the wing surfaces of live insects form a common plane like in house flies (the wing position of the live insects is not preserved in museum specimens). For example, the latter case is found in Rhotana maculata and apparently also R. latipennis, the type of the genus and these species often raise the wings in a way which displays the markings of the forewings as well as those of the hindwings.

=== Genus Rhotanella Fennah 1970 ===
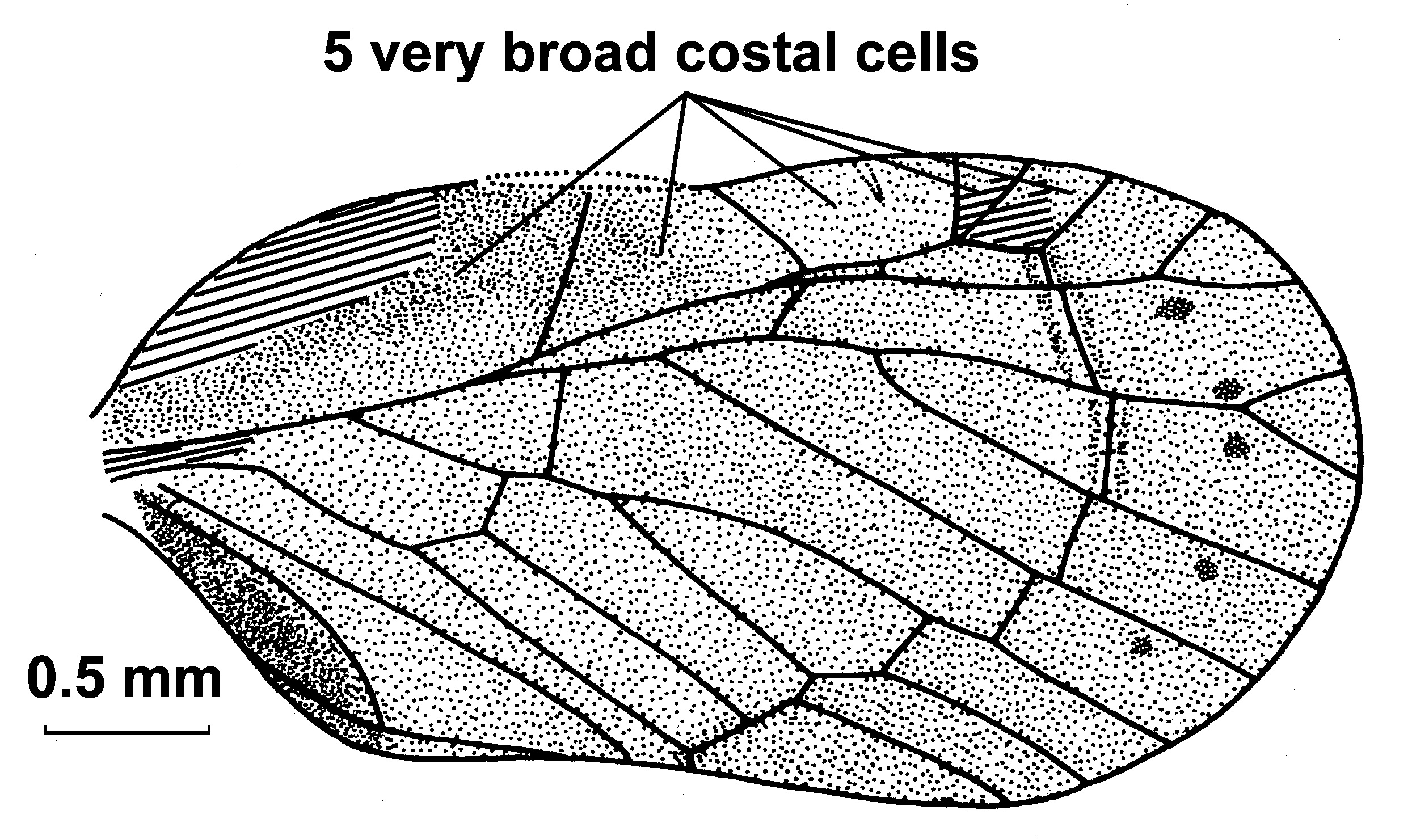
forewing of Rhotanella thyrsis

Rhotanella is a small genus of the tribe Rhotanini with only 8 species as of 2026. These can be easily recognized by their forewings which are wide at the base and have 5 very broad costal cells. Especially the first costal cell is extremely broad and often has a bright red area adjacent to the costal margin. Its width is typically one quarter the width of the whole wing. The second costal cell has the shape of a trapezoid and the fourth is triangular. The forewings have a brownish colour and in several species there are rows of whitish spots around the veins. Unlike most other species of Rhotanini, the profile of the head is not rounded but angulated with a triangular or rectangular outline. The rostrum is short and does not reach the hind coxae.

=== Genus Saccharodite Kirkaldy 1907 ===
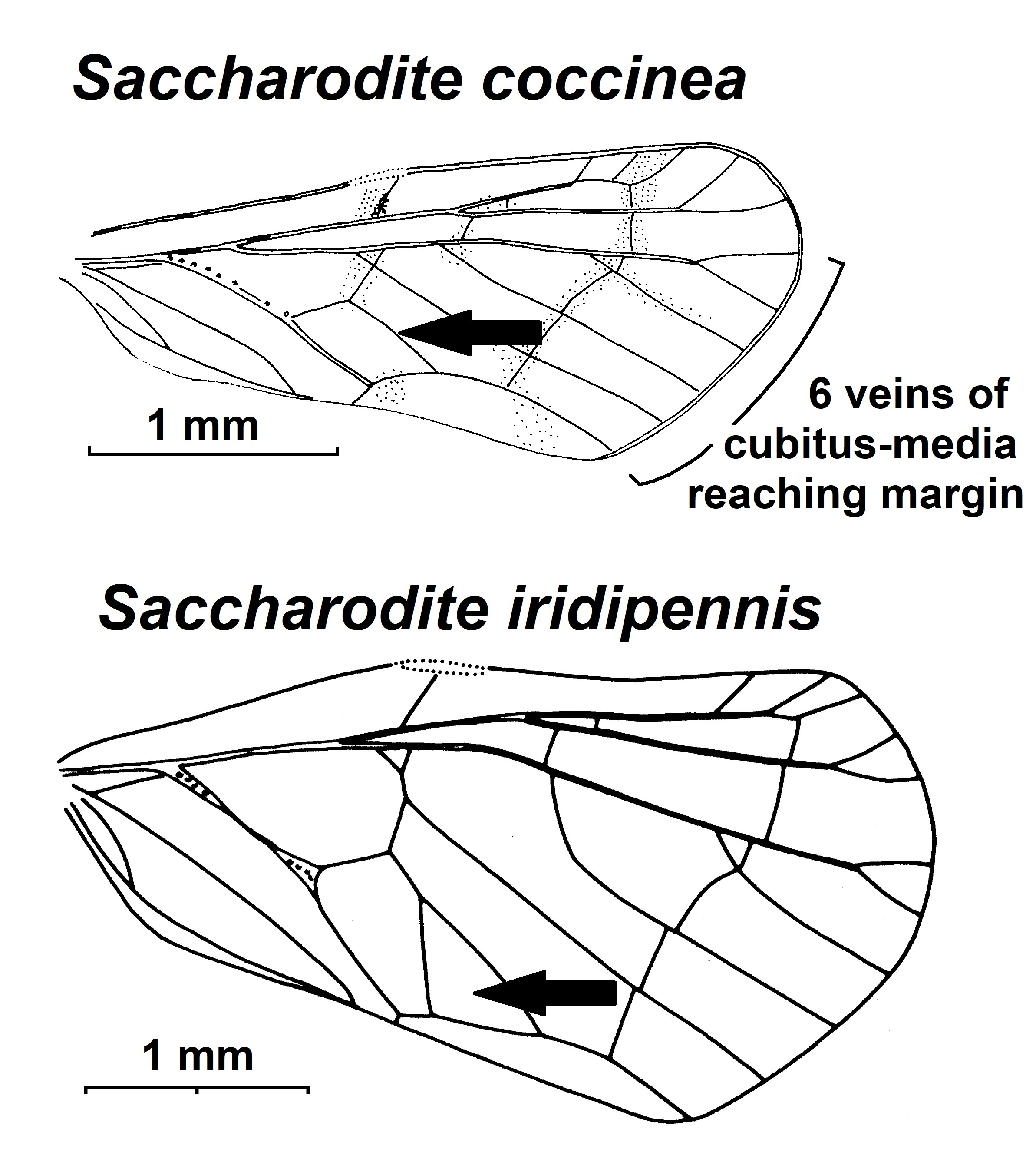
forewings of Saccharodite coccinea (top) and Saccharodite iridipennis (bottom)

Saccharodite is the largest genus in the tribe Rhotanini with more than 100 species described. These are widely distributed, ranging from Sri Lanka in the West over southern parts of mainland Asia to the Ryukyu Islands (southern Japan) in the North, the western Pacific islands like Micronesia and Fiji in the East, to northern and eastern Australia including Tasmania in the South. The type species, Saccharodite sanguinea has been described from Java (Indonesia).

The species of Saccharodite can be recognized by the forewings having only 4 costal cells and in most species only 6 veins of the cubitus-media complex reaching the margin at the end of the wing. The basal branch of the media posterior splits again close to its base and the inner vein of that fork joins the branch of the cubitus anterior forming the basal median cell. However, in most species of Saccharodite both veins separate again after a short distance and then join once more, forming a characteristic triangular cell (see the forewing of Saccharodite iridipennis on the right where the triangular cell is marked with an arrow). Both veins remain joined in only one species, Saccharodite coccinea (see the illustration on the right). The forewings are usually glassy and the surfaces of both wings form a common plane in all species. In profile, the head is usually evenly rounded, but may be angulated at the border between vertex and face. There are often bright red marks on the head and the body. For example, the scutellum or even the whole mesonotum might be bright red (see the gallery above).

The very short description of the genus and the type species (Saccharodite sanguinea) by G.-W. Kirkaldy is not sufficient to identify the genus. In addition, it has been impossible to locate a type specimen for S. sanguinea. In 1969, R.G. Fennah redefined and redescribed the genus, based on Kirdaldy's description, stating that "the combination of diminutive size, a distinctly angulate profile of the head, virtually colourless hyaline tegmina, and a bright red body is sufficient to enable this genus to be recognised". Fennah's redefinition of Saccharodite has been accepted based on the principle of the first reviser. It has been also suggested that S. sanguinea could be identical to a species now known as Saccharodite coccinea (Matsumura, 1940). That species has, however, a unique venation pattern for Saccharodite, see illustration at the right.

=== Genus Sumangala Distant 1911 ===
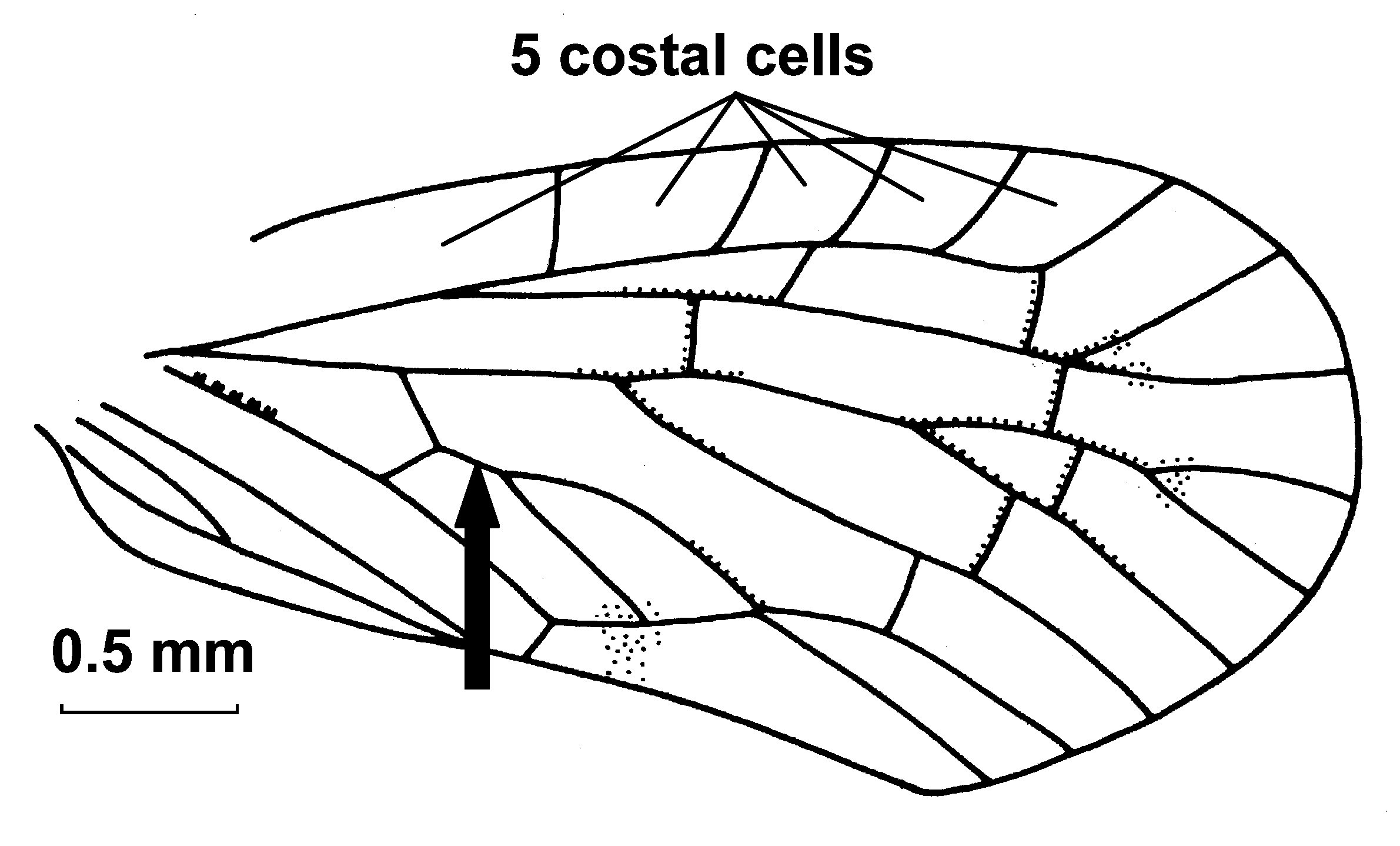
forewing of Sumangala delicatula

The genus Sumangala is a small genus of Rhotanini (13 described species as of 2026) which is found in tropical parts of southern Asia as well as in some neighbouring islands like Sri Lanka, Taiwan, the Philippines and parts of Indonesia. The species can be recognised by the venation of the forewings where a branch of the cubitus anterior (CuA1) joins the basal branch of the media (arrow in illustration on the right). Both veins separate again after a short distance and reach the margin at the end of the wing separately. The basal branch of the media does not fork like in other genera of the Rhotanini and as a consequence only 6 veins of the cubitus-media complex reach the margin at the end of the wing, a feature which is only shared by the genus Saccharodite. Nearly all species of Sumangala are lightly coloured with whitish wings and mostly lack particular wing patterns.
