= Alara =

Alara may refer to:

== People ==
- Alara Atmaca (born 2009), Turkish female fencer
- Alara of Ilara-Mokin, the king of Ilara-Mokin land in Nigeria
- Alara of Kush, a king of Kush
- Āḷāra Kālāma, a hermit saint, a teacher of yogic meditation and teacher of Gautama Buddha
- Luis Alberto Fernández Alara (born 1946), Argentine Roman Catholic bishop
- Cheche Alara, music director
- Alara Şehitler (born 2006), German footballer

== Other uses ==
- ALARA, an acronym for "As Low As Reasonably Achievable"
- Alara (insect), an insect genus in the family Derbidae
- Alara Castle, a medieval castle in Alanya, southern Turkey
- Alara (fairy), a lake creature from Turkish mythology
- Alara block, a block of card expansions for the trading card game Magic: The Gathering
- Alara Kitan, a character on American science-fiction TV series The Orville
