= Grey wolf (mythology) =

Turkic-Mongolian mythology

The Grey wolf or Graywolf (Old Turkic: Böri) is a sacred animal and national symbol in Turkic, Mongolian, and Altaic mythology. In Turkish it is known as Bozkurt (Boskord, Pusgurt, Gökkurt, Gökbörü, Kökbörü). In Mongolian it is called Börteçine (Börteşına, Börtöşono).

== Significance of the Grey Wolf ==
The sacred, way-finding wolf is the common symbol of all Turkic and Mongolian tribes. Some Turkic and Mongolian tribes believe their lineage derives from this blessed being. Most of the time, one branch of lineage comes from the Sky Wolf (Gökkurt) and the other branch comes from the Sky Deer (Gökgeyik). The Grey Wolf represents the sky, while the fallow deer symbolizes the earth.

There is a picture of a wolf head on the sky-blue flags of the Göktürks. This represents their fighting spirit, freedom, speed, intelligence, and ability to read the battlefield. Göktürks would erect poles with a golden wolf head in front of their tents. The Warrior Spirit (god) takes on the appearance of a wolf. When a threat against a Turkic nation appears, the Grey Wolf also emerges to guide that nation. Elders and saints sometimes disguise themselves as wolves. A sixth-century Turkic stone monument depicts a boy suckling milk from a wolf.

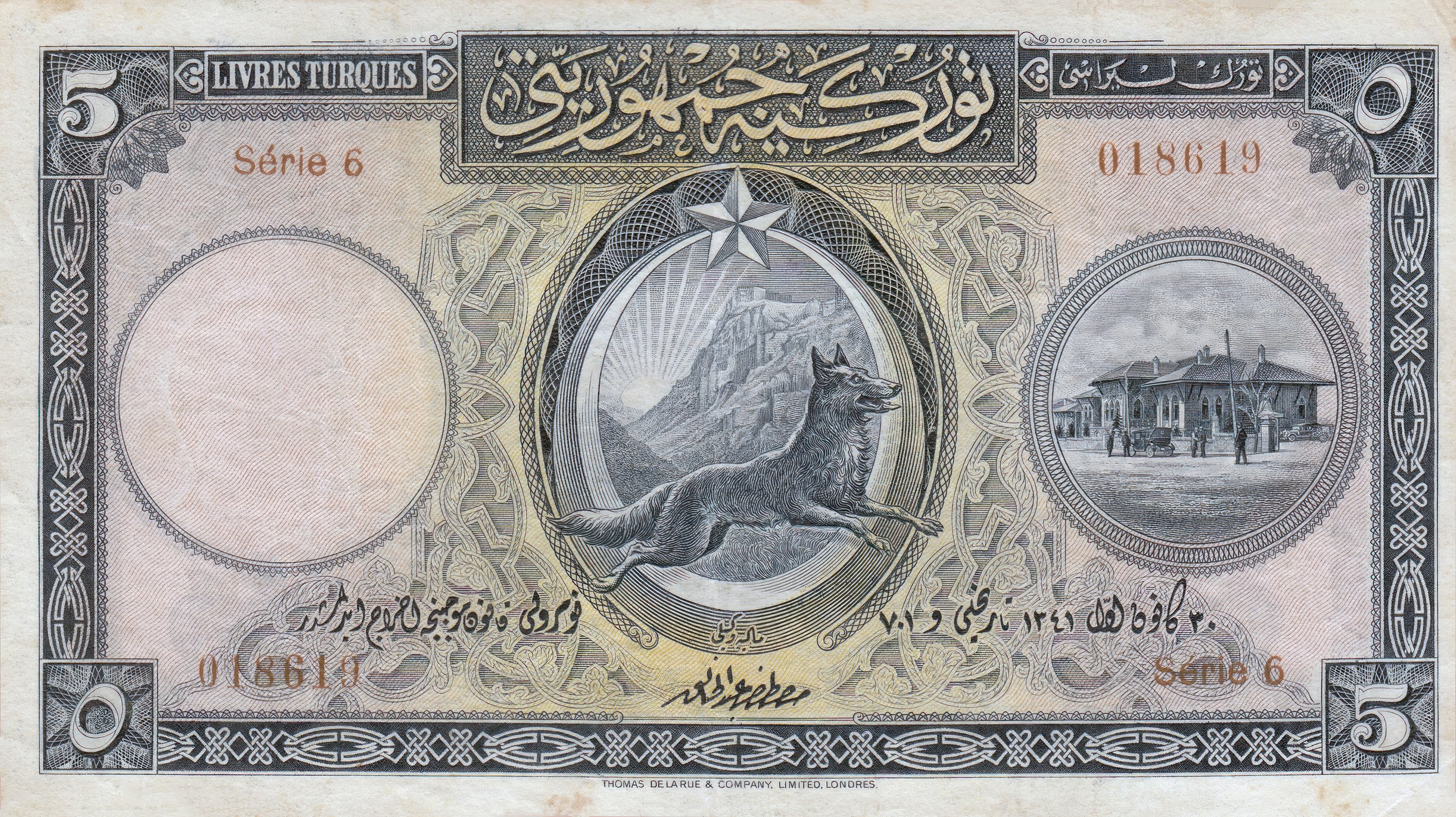
5 Turkish Lira banknote with the image of Bozkurt issued on December 5, 1927

In Turkic folk culture, it is believed that carrying a wolf tooth in your pocket will protect you from the evil eye. In the Yakut documents their guardian wolf is referred to as Bosko. For the Kyrgyz people, seeing a wolf while walking in the steppe was seen as a sign of good luck and safety. Seeing a wolf in a dream was also a good sign. They used to put wolf teeth or skin under their pillows to protect the pregnant woman from the evil eye. It was also considered a blessing if a wolf dove into a flock of sheep or if it entered a barn. According to Bashkir mythology, a wolf fell in front of the ancient Bashkirs and showed them the way. Therefore, they were called Bashkirs, which means "with a wolf on their heads."

The crescent tactic (or the Turanian/Turkic tactic), the strategy of baiting an enemy into the center and enclosing them in a crescent shape, was first applied by the Turkic people after seeing it being used by wolves.

The Bozkurt was considered sacred by Turks in pre-Islamic times and continued to be a symbol of Turkish identity in later periods. Historical research shows that various Turkic peoples that migrated to the west such as the Huns, Kipchaks and Pechenegs used this symbol to denote their heritage. The main reason that the Grey Wolf is considered sacred and is the national symbol of the Turks is based on the belief that a she-wolf named Asena (Kökböri, Bozkurt) guided the Turks as they emerged from Ergenekon by melting the iron mountains, as described in the Epic of Ergenekon.

Today the Grey Wolf is a symbol of Turkish nationalism. It was declared a national symbol by Atatürk and is used in many places. In the early years of the republic, images of the Grey Wolf were printed on Turkish lira notes.

== The Creation Epic of Gaoche ==
The story known as the Turkic creation myth is the creation epic of Gaoche. It is included in the Book of Wei and the History of the Northern Dynasties from the Chinese chronicles. A male wolf plays a role in this epic.

The tanyu of Hiung-nu had two beautiful daughters that he decided to offer to god. He built a high tower over the land and begged god to take his daughters as wives. The god took them and left them in the tower. An old wolf had settled in a cave at the base of the tower and one of the girls thought the wolf was the god. Despite her sister's objections, she descended from the tower became the wolf's wife, and later gave birth to his child.

== The Creation Epic of Asena ==
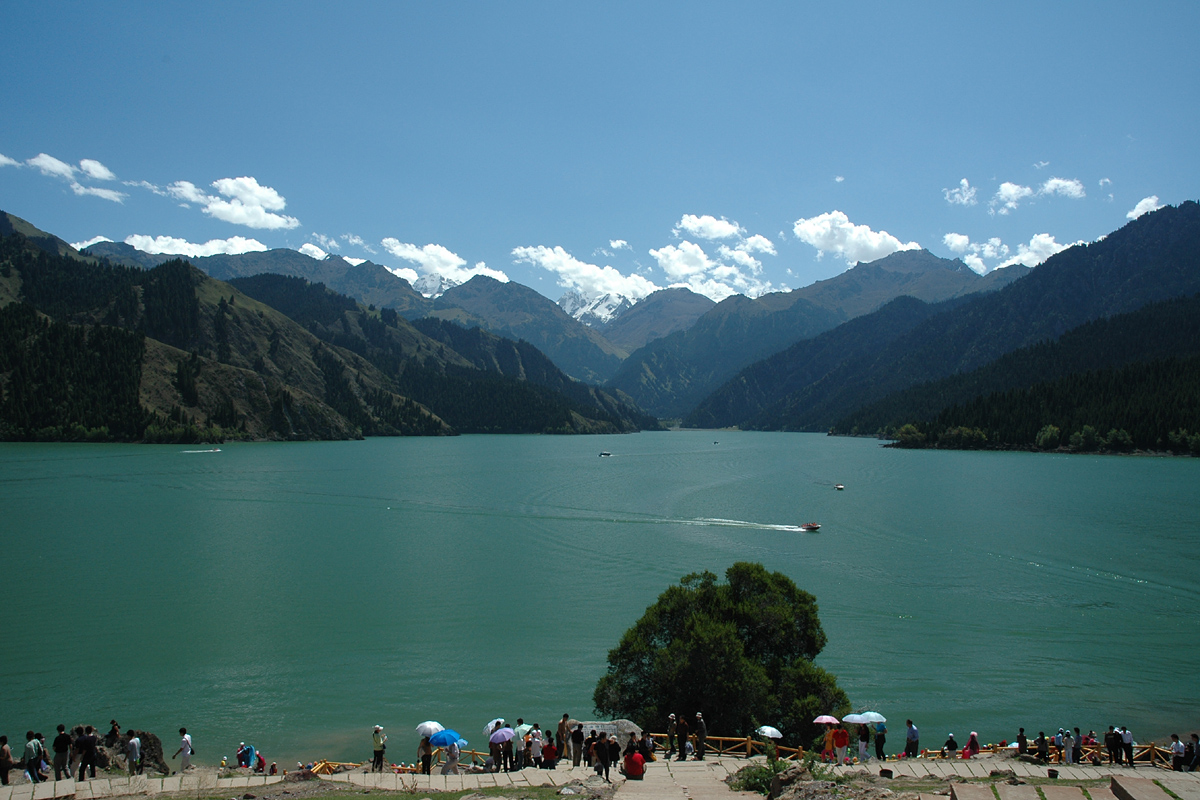
Tianchi Lake and Bogda Shan in the Mountains of God (Fukang, Changji Hui Autonomous Prefecture, Xinjiang Uygur Autonomous Region)

The Epic of Asena is included in the Book of Chou, the History of the Northern Dynasties, and the Book of Sui from the Chinese chronicles. In these epics, the she-wolf plays a role.

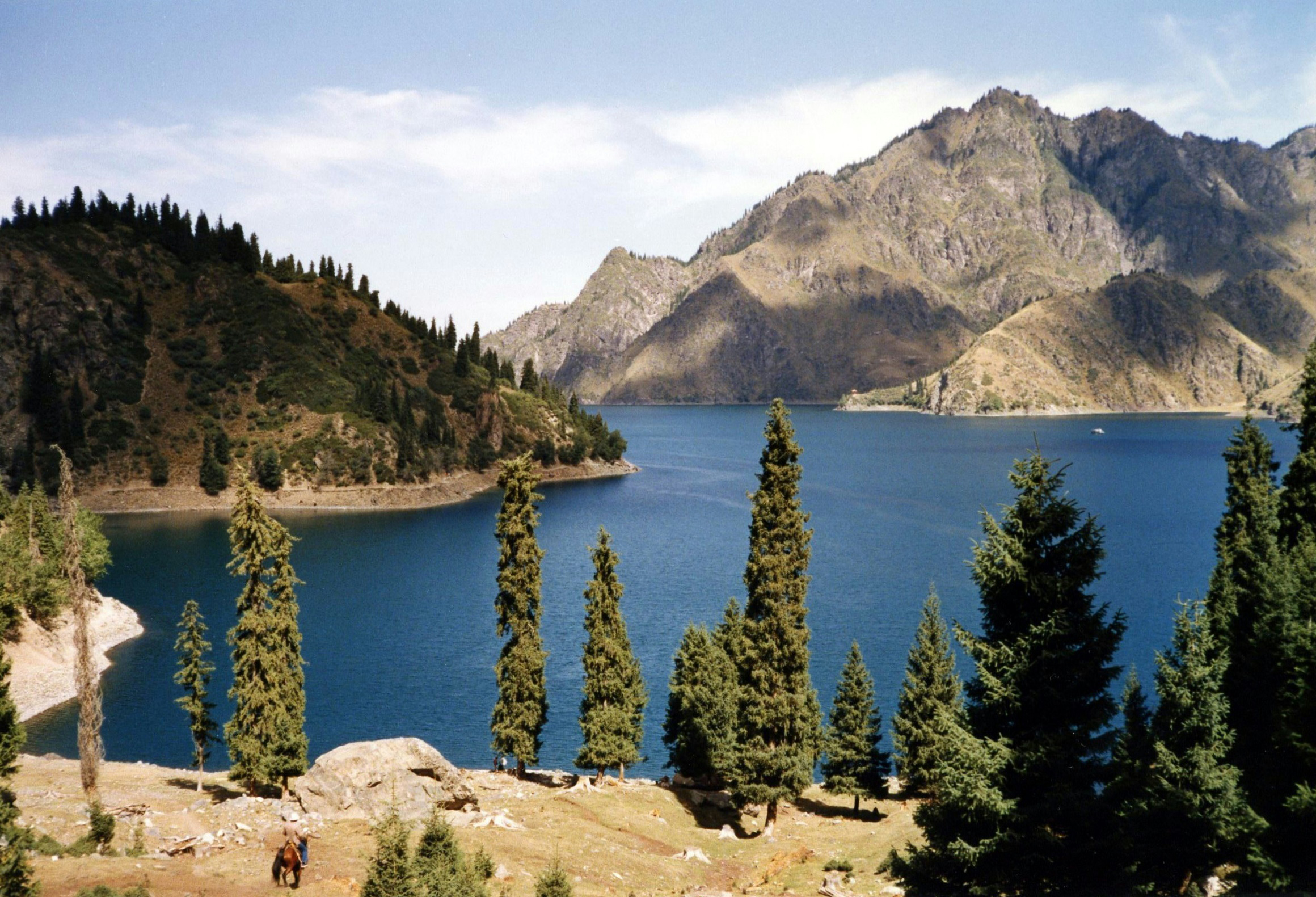
Tianchi Lake on the northern side of the Bogda Shan range

=== Epic 1 ===
According to the legend Ötöken, the capital city of the Göktürks, was attacked and all residents were killed by the enemy - only one boy survived the massacre. The soldiers could not bear to kill him because he was too young, so instead they cut off his feet (and arms in the Book of Sui) and left him in a swampy place. There a she-wolf named Asena found the boy close to death and fed the boy with meat. When the boy became a teenager, he impregnated the wolf. Hearing this, the neighboring nation sent men to kill the boy as well as the wolf, but Asena escaped to Bogda Shan in the country of Gaochang (northwest of Gaochang in the Book of Sui). Through a cave in the mountain, the wolf found a plain covered in meadows and surrounded on all four sides by mountains hundreds of miles wide. Asena hides in the cave and gives birth to ten boys. The ten boys grow up and find girls to marry and each of them fathers a lineage. One of them is the Ashina clan. Their sons and grandsons multiply. After a few generations, they all leave the cave. Then they become blacksmiths for the Rouran Khaganate.

=== Epic 2 ===
The Turks first emerged from the country of Suo in the north of Hiung-nu. Abangbu, one of the elders of the tribe, was one of seventeen brothers. One of them, Yizhi Nishidou, was born of a wolf. Because the Bangbugils were bad-tempered, their country was destroyed. Nishidou could call the winds and the rains. He married two wives, the daughter of the god of summer and the daughter of the god of winter. Quadruplets were born, one of whom became Baihong (the great white bird). Another one settled between the Afushui and Jianshui rivers and was named Qigu. Another one settled at the Chuzheshui River. Another resided on the mountain of Jiansichuzheshishan and his name was Daer.

== The Wusun Epic ==
In the Chinese chronicles Shiji and the Book of Han, a crow and a she-wolf fed a child.

The king of Wusun was attacked and killed by the Hiung-nu. Only the son of the king, Kun-mo (昆莫), was left alive. A crow fed him meat and the wolf fed him milk. The tanyu of Hiung-nu thought Kun-mo was a god and took him in and raised him.

== The Epic of Ergenekon ==
This story is a Göktürk epic. It begins with a few remaining Turks, who had been ambushed and destroyed by their neighbors, searching for a way to hide in a mountainous area. Finding a plain hidden among the mountains, these Turks settle there and multiply. Centuries later, when they outgrow it, they want to get out. But they could not find the exit. Then they realized that the surrounding mountains were made of iron ore and they melted the iron and climbed out. They were guided by a male wolf named Börteçine.

== Wolves in Turkic Communities ==
=== Tuva Turks ===
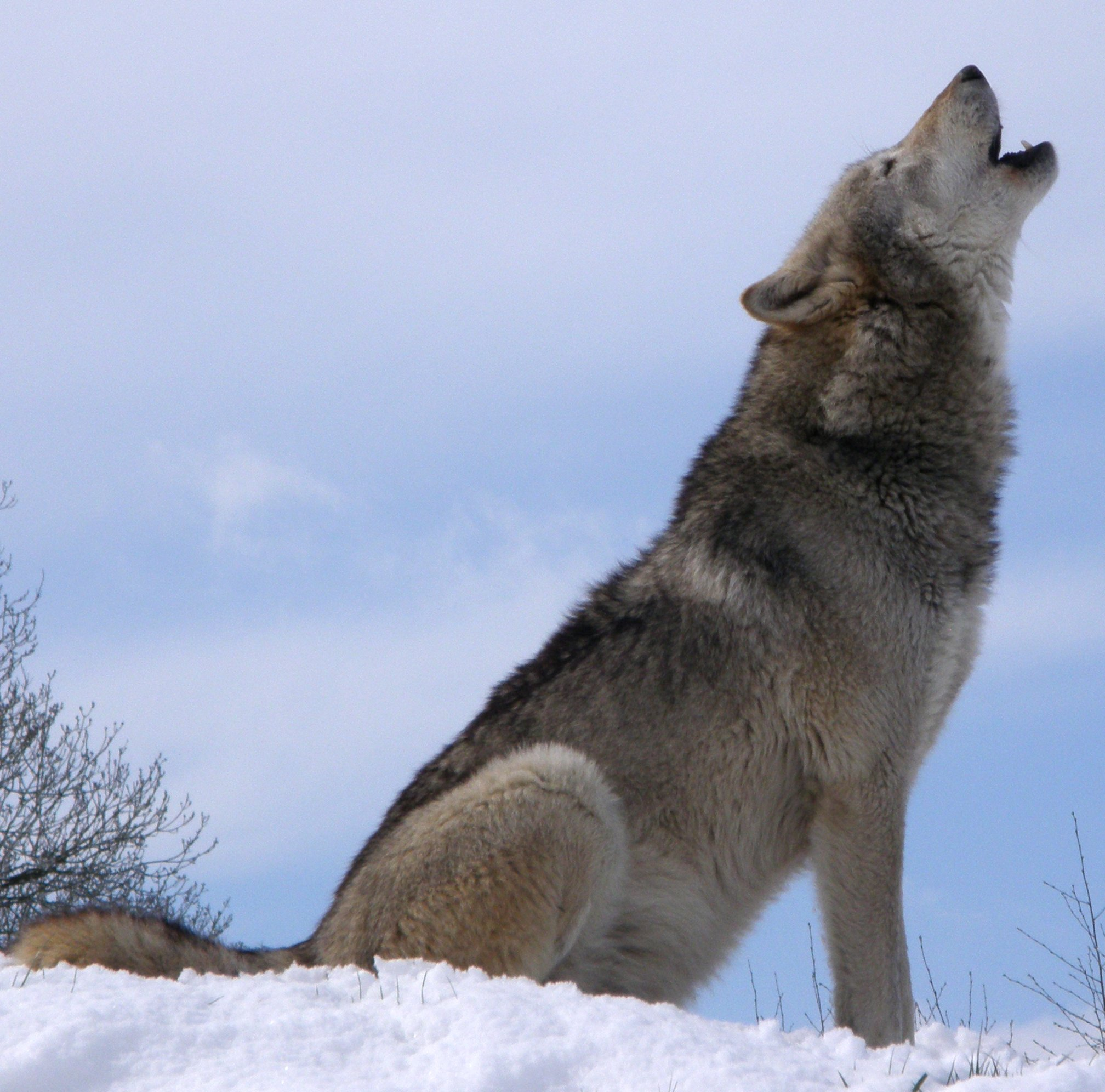
Börü (Wolf)

In Tuvan Kam algış (shaman prayers) introductions are spoken in the form of “Kök börü” (original wolf) and “Kuğu börü” (swan wolf | chestnut colored wolf). In the ancient Tuva oral tradition, the grey wolf was the messenger of God.

=== Kyrgyz Turks ===
Ancient Kyrgyz Turks used to call their great heroes and warriors “börü” (wolf) or “Kök börü” (original wolf). There was also a popular saying that the Kazakhs, Kyrgyz, and wolves are all brothers. Wolf means greatness and valor. In the epics, the phrase “wolf with sky mane” was used for their heroes. In the Manas Epic, Manas Khan is described as having wolf-eyes and a gray mustache (Börü közdüü, ku murut). The arrows of Manas are also called “börü tildü, çal yiba” (wolf-tongued gray arrow). The descendants of Manas were addressed as "grey wolf sultan".

=== Kipchak Turks ===
Among the Kipchak Turks or Cumans, the leadership role of the wolf dates back to the mid-2nd century. There are records of Kipchaks asking for help from the wolf.

=== Qashqai Turks ===
Qashqai Turks believe that the wolf brings good luck. The wolf is known as a protector of herds. Therefore, shooting at a wolf brings bad luck and leads to the destruction of the herd. A wolf's paw is hung from the cradle of children, and children are fed the wolf's liver to make them brave. Qashqai carpets have a pattern surrounding the whole carpet, which is called Alakurt (beautiful wolf). The Alakurt protects the carpet like the walls of a castle. The Qashqai Turk proverb, “Onun kurdu ulamış” (he is linked to his wolf) is said when someone is lucky. Seeing a wolf in a dream is considered auspicious.

== Other ==
During the 1930s the Kemalists issued a grey wolf picture on postage stamps.

== See also ==
- Wolves in folklore, religion and mythology
- Asena
- Romulus and Remus
- Wolf salute
