= Çor =

Jinn-like being in Turkic and Mongolian mythologies

Çor refers to jinn-like being in Turkic and Mongolian mythologies. It is thought of as an invisible entity. Although they act mostly independent, sometimes they are connected to specific places like trees, places under a bridge or ruins. Like human-beings, a Çor can be good (Aq-Çor or white Çor) or evil (Qara-Çor or black Çor) and hence have free-will like humans. They become visible when they die.

Unlike the İye, the Çor is not a tutelary spirit. They are thought to be responsible for several mental disorders.

After embracing Islam, they were replaced by jinn. Thus they are thought to be created from fire, fear iron, and are thought to disappear after reciting the Basmala. Despite being generally feared, they are not necessarily evil in nature.

This term is also linked to the Russian term Chort, referring to evil forces like demons or the devil.
