= Bichura (folklore) =

Spirit in Turkic mythology

Bichura (Cyrillic: Бичура; Latin: Biçura) is a house spirit in Turkic mythology.

It has also been said that Bichura can take on the appearance of cats or dogs. Other stories either give them completely monstrous appearance, or none at all. The actions performed by a Bichura vaguely resemble those of poltergeists and are not necessarily harmful. It wears red dresses.

== Features ==
Traditionally, every house is said to have a Bichura. He would pull hair to warn a woman of danger from an abusive man. He would moan and howl to warn of coming trouble. If he showed himself, it forewarned of death, and if he was weeping it was said to be a death in the family. In folklore says that a Bichura could harass horses in the stable overnight, as well as steal the grain of a neighbour to feed his own horses. If Bichura becomes unhappy, it plays nasty tricks on the members of the household. Those include moving and rattling small objects, breaking dishes, leaving muddy little footprints, causing the walls of a house to creak, banging on pots and moaning. If the family can determine the cause of their Bichuras discontent, they can rectify the situation and return things to normal. More often than not, however, families live in harmony with the spirits, and no problems arise.

When she inhabits a house, she lives behind the stove or in the cellar. When home builders wanted to do something harmful to the person buying the house, they would bring in Bichura. Once inside, it is difficult to get her to leave. When the house is in order, Bichura looks after the chickens and housework. If not, she whistles, breaks dishes, and makes noises at night. She also comes out at night to spin.

== Chor / Chura ==
There are two different kinds of Chura. The other is Archura, a woodland spirit and consort of Orman İyesi
