= Awakkule =

Figure in Crow Native American mythology

Awakkulé is a Native American mythological figure of the Plains Indians Crow Nation people. It is described as an imp who can both assist people, or alternately play harmless pranks on them.
