= Sheka =

Sheka may refer to:

- Sheka Zone, in the Southern Nations, Nationalities and Peoples' Region (SNNPR), Ethiopia
  - Sheka (kingdom), a former kingdom located in Ethiopia
- Sheka (mythology), a dwarf in the Tatar mythology
- Sheka (rural locality), a rural locality (a selo) in the Republic of Tatarstan, Russia
