= Şüräle =

Forest spirit in Turkic mythology

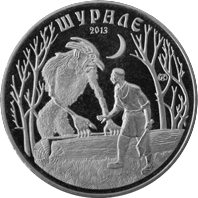
Shurale and the woodcutter on a Kazakh 50 tenge coin, 2013

Şüräle or Shurale (Tatar and Bashkir: Шүрәле, Şüräle) is a forest spirit in Turkic mythology (especially Tatar and Bashkir). According to legends, Shurali lives in forests. He has long fingers, a horn on its forehead, and a woolly body. He lures victims into the thickets and can tickle them to death.

Shurali closely resembles other similar characters from the folklore such as Arçuri of the Chuvash, Pitsen (Picen) of the Siberian Tatars and Yarımtıq of the Ural Tatars.

== Description ==
He can shapeshift into many different forms. As a human, he looks like a peasant with glowing eyes, and his shoes are on backwards. A person who befriends Şüräle can learn the secrets of magic. Şüräle has many tricks, including leading peasants astray, making them sick, or tickling them to death. They are also known to hide the axes of woodcutters. A person gets lost in the woods when a Şüräle crosses their path. To find the way out, you have to turn your clothes inside out and wear shoes on opposite feet.

== In modern culture ==
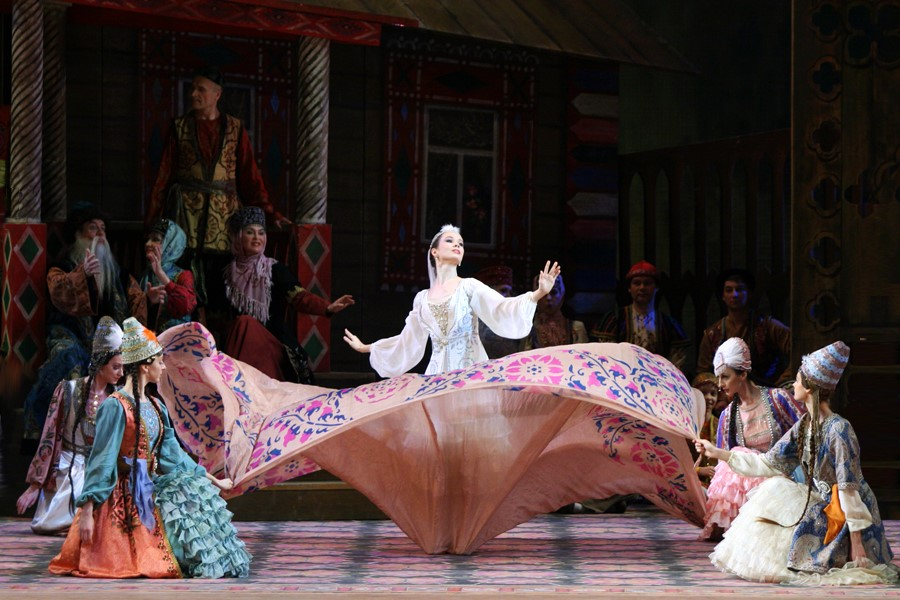
Şüräle ballet, 2019

Inspired by the Tatar folklore, Ghabdulla Tuqay wrote a poem Şüräle.

The first Tatar ballet by Farit Yarullin Şüräle was based on the poem.

In 1987 Soyuzmultfilm released an animated film Shurale about a superstitious lad with shurale only in his imagination and the poem is hinted only in the first cadres which show a portrait of Tuqay.

In 2014 Tatarmultfilm studio released a Tatar-language animated film Шүрәле which includes an episode how a woodcutter tricked shurale. In 2020 ShayanTV released Tatar-language plasticine-animated film Шүрәле.

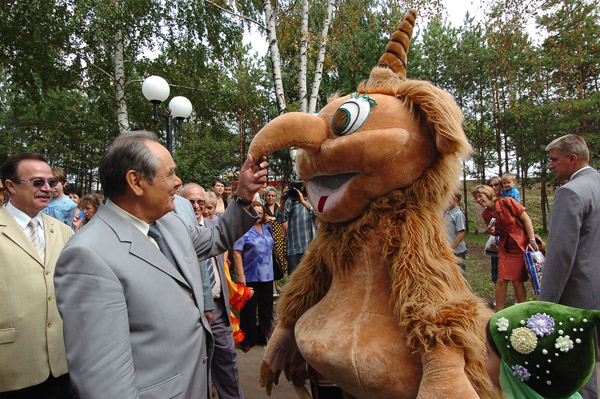
Shurale in Shurale park

The amusement park Kyrlay was initially called "Shurale".

== See also ==
- Archura
- Äbädä

== Bibliography ==
- Mitolojik Varlıklar, Çulpan Zaripova
- Tatar Türklerinde Varlıklar, Çulpan Zaripova (Şürälä)

== Related links ==
- English translation of the poem
- French translation of an article about Shurale
- Russian translation of the poem
- The Myth of Shurale
- Айгуль Габаши, «ШУРАЛЕ», журнал «Татарский мир» № 3, 2005 (in Russian)
- Памятник Шурале в Казани (in Russian)

Arçura/Şüräle: Mythical Spirits of the Volga-Ural Forests, Rustem Sulteev. http://akademiai.com/doi/abs/10.1556/062.2018.71.1.4?journalCode=062
