= Alara (fairy) =

Turkic mythological figure

Alara (Cyrillic: Әләрә) is a water fairy from Turkic mythology. A popular female name in Turkish culture, Alara is also referenced in the mythologies of Siberian people and told in the folklore and elders' stories among the Yakut people.

Said to originate from Lake Baikal and made of the love tears of a thousand women, Alara takes the appearance of a beautiful little girl with butterfly-like wings made of light but sprinkle water as she beats them to hover above the lake. Her beauty and youth depend on water so she must always remain close to water sources. She has the power to remove hate and greed from people's hearts and hence make them capable of true love. Those who seek Alara's help must travel to a lake where she was last seen and tie a colorful ribbon on the branch of a blooming lakeside tree. If the ribbon was cut from a handkerchief last used to wipe off the tears of a heartbroken person, the wish becomes more likely to come true. Wishes must be made under a cloudless night sky shortly before dawn. Alara then answers the wish maker with a light breeze, a shooting star, a light show of bioluminescent algae or by outright manifesting herself and even talking to the wish maker.

== See also ==
- Äbädä
- Archura
