= Imp =

Mythological being similar to a demon or fairy

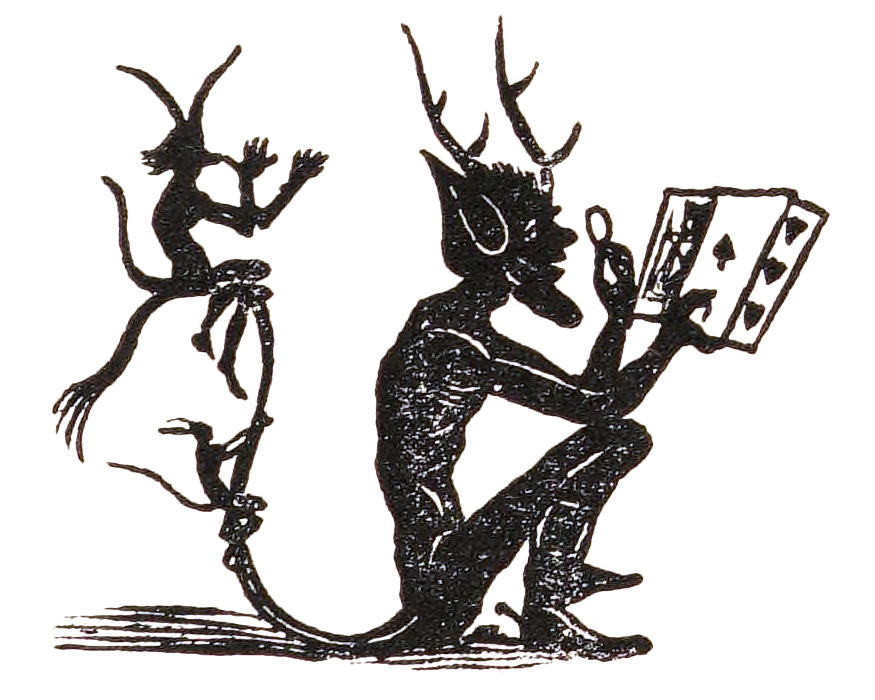
French illustration of imps (c. 1838)

An imp is a European mythological being similar to a fairy or demon, frequently described in folklore and superstition. The word may perhaps derive from the term ympe, used to denote a young grafted tree.

Imps are often described as troublesome and mischievous more than seriously threatening or dangerous, and as lesser beings rather than more important supernatural beings. The attendants of the devil are sometimes described as imps. They are usually described as lively and having small stature.

== Etymology ==
The Old English noun impa meant a young shoot or scion of a plant or tree, and later came to mean the scion of a noble house, or a child in general. Starting in the 16th century, it was often used in expressions like "imps of serpents", "imp of hell", "imp of the devil", and so on; and by the 17th century, it came to mean a small demon, a familiar of a witch. The Old English noun and associated verb impian appear to come from an unattested Late Latin term *emputa (impotus is attested in the Salic law), the neuter plural of Ancient Greek: ἔμϕυτος 'natural, implanted, grafted'.

== History ==
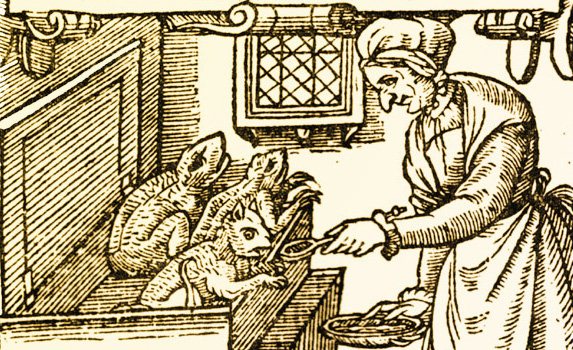
Old woodcut depicting a woman feeding imps

Unlike the Christian folklore, demons in Germanic legends were not necessarily always evil. Imps were often mischievous rather than evil or harmful. In some religions, they were attendants of the gods.

=== The Lincoln Imp ===
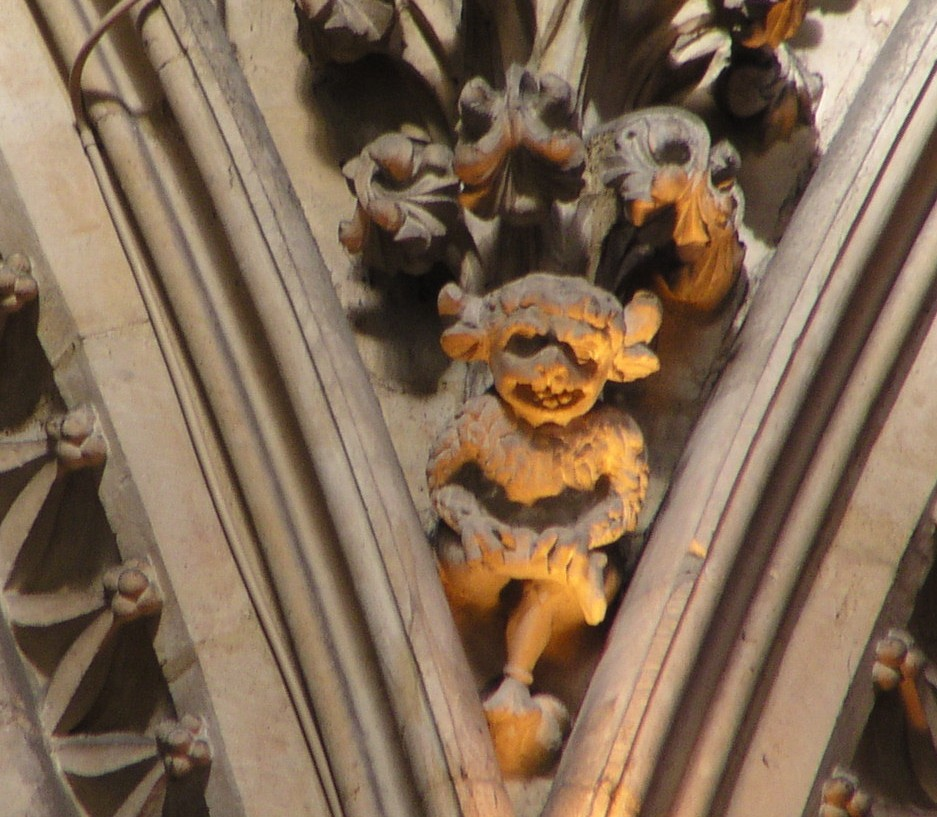
A statue of the Lincoln Imp inside the medieval Lincoln Cathedral in Lincoln, England. It has now become a symbol of the city.

A legend in Lincolnshire dating to the 14th-century recounts that the devil, being annoyed with the completion of the cathedral, paid a visit, accompanied by two imps who proceeded to wreak havoc in the building. An angel appeared and ordered them to stop. One turned to throw a rock at the angel and was instantly petrified.

For the tiniest angel, with amethyst eyes,
And hair spun like gold, 'fore the alter [sic] did rise,
Pronouncing these words in a dignified tone
"O impious imp, be ye turned to stone!"

While his companion fled, the unfortunate imp remains enslaved by the Angel Choir at the east end of the cathedral. The imp is also depicted on the emblem of the local football team Lincoln City F.C. They are also nicknamed The Imps.

=== Other descriptions ===
Imps are often shown as small in stature and not good-looking. Their behaviour is described as being wild and uncontrollable, much the same as fairies', and in some cultures they are considered the same beings, both sharing the same sense of free spirit and enjoyment of all things fun. It was later in history that people began to associate fairies as being good and imps as being malicious and evil. However, both creatures were fond of pranks and misleading people. Most of the time, these pranks were harmless fun, but some could be upsetting and harmful, such as the switching of babies or leading travelers astray in places unfamiliar to them. Although imps are often thought of as being immortal, they can be damaged or harmed by certain weapons and enchantments, or be kept out of people's homes by wards.

Imps were also portrayed as lonely little creatures in search of human attention, using jokes and pranks to attract human friendship. This often backfired when people became annoyed with the imp's endeavours, usually driving it away.

Even if the imp was successful in getting the friendship it sought, it still often played pranks on its friend, either out of boredom or simply because this was the nature of the imp. This trait led to using the word “impish” for someone who loves pranks and practical jokes. Eventually, it came to be believed that imps were the familiar spirit servants of witches and warlocks, where the little demons served as spies and informants. During the time of the witch hunts, supernatural creatures such as imps were sought out as proof of witchcraft, though often the so-called imp was merely a black cat, a lizard, a toad or some other form of uncommon pet.

==== Objects ====
Imps have also been described as being “bound” or contained in some sort of object such as a sword or a crystal ball. In other cases, imps were simply kept in a certain object, and then summoned only when their masters had need of them. Some even had the ability to grant their owner's wishes, much like a genie. This was the object of the 1891 story The Bottle Imp by Robert Louis Stevenson, which told of an imp contained in a bottle that would grant the owner their every wish, but their soul would be sent to Hell if they didn't sell the bottle to a new owner before their death.

==== Culture ====
Imps can be found in art and architecture throughout the world, often imps are carefully hidden, only being found by the most observant people.

Other Stories

Imps have appeared in Rumpelstiltskin, Johnny Got His Gun, The Lottery, The Exorcist, Who Censored Roger Rabbit, The Girl Next Door, A Short Stay in Hell, Ghostbusters, Hercules, Wizard101 and Strange Magic.

== See also ==
- Bies
- Chort
- Deal with the Devil
- Demon
- Domovoy
- Fairy
- Familiar
- Familiar spirit
- Fantasy
- Folklore
- Genie
- Goblin
- Gremlin
- Leprechaun
- Machine elf
- Magic
- Magic (illusion)
- Magic (supernatural)
- Myth
- Mythology
- Shapeshifting
- Superstition
- Troll
- Witchcraft
