= Bichura =

Bichura (Russian: Бичура) is the name of several rural localities in Russia:

- Bichura, Amur Oblast, a selo in Dmitriyevsky Rural Settlement of Mazanovsky District in Amur Oblast
- Bichura, Republic of Buryatia, a selo in Kirovsky Selsoviet of Bichursky District in the Republic of Buryatia
