= Qarakorshaq =

Mythical creature in Turkic mythology

Qarakorshaq (Old Turkic: 𐰚𐰀𐰺𐰀𐰚𐰗𐰺𐱁𐰀𐰚) is an animal-like mythical creature in Turkic mythology. Qarakorshaq is described as hiding in dark places, holes or abandoned houses, waiting to grab, carry away and devour its victim; but it can be scared away by light and noise. It has clumsy gait. Analysis of Qarakorshaq's attributes has led to the conclusion that it may actually derive from a folk memory of certain real animals, which have long since become regionally extinct in certain parts of Anatolia and are now known only in legend.

== Sources ==
- Türklerde Tabiat Üstü Varlıklar ve Bunlarla İlgili Kabuller, İnanmalar, Uygulamalar, Yrd.DoçDr. Ayşe DUVARCI "Kara-korşak"
