= Pitsen =

Pitsen is a forest creature in the Siberian Tatars' mythology.

Pitsen's role is contradictory. It could bring luck, but also troubles, leading humans to the wilderness.

Shapeshifting is common for Pitsen: he may look like an elder with a staff and knapsack, but also like different animals, for example apes. Pitsen prefers to live in derelict lodges. He also likes to ride horses and to oil their mane with tar.

Pitsen, when transformed to a damsel, may have sexual intercourse or marry a human. One legend says that one hunter happened upon beautiful damsel in a forest and married her. Soon they become rich. Once he came home ahead of time and saw a tusky monster eating lizards. He cried, being horrified, and that moment his wife and his riches disappeared.

Pitsen is a counterpart of Chuvash Arçuri and Volga-Ural Tatar Şüräle. In the mythology of the Siberian Tatars, Tobol and Omsk Tatars had shaggy and stinking yysh-keshe. They carry away travelers and force them to marry. At night the spirit of yysh-keshe used to fly away from an armpit.

== See also ==
- Şüräle
- Yeti
- Shapeshifting
