= List of Alara species =

Genus of planthoppers

The following species in the insect genus Alara (family Derbidae, tribe Rhotanini) are recognized. Basionyms are given in square brackets.

- Alara alboapicalis Zelazny 1981 (Philippines, common)
- Alara anulus Zelazny 2011 (West Papua, Indonesia, rare)
- Alara aquilonia Zelazny 2011 (Laos, rare)
- Alara armifera Zelazny 2011 (Papua, Indonesia, uncommon)
- Alara armilla Zelazny 2011 (Islands of New Guinea, New Britain & New Ireland, common)
- Alara australiensis Zelazny 2011 (Queensland, Australia, rare)
- Alara castanea Zelazny 1981 (Philippines, common)
- Alara cervus Zelazny 1981 (Philippines, northern Borneo, rare)
- Alara cheesmani Zelazny 2011 (Papua, Papua New Guinea, rare)
- Alara clava Zelazny 2011 (North Borneo, Sabah, Malaysia, rare)
- Alara cornigera Zelazny 2011 (West Malaysia, rare)
- Alara cranstoni Zelazny 2011 (North Borneo, Sarawak, Malaysia, rare)
- Alara cultellus Zelazny 2011 (Islands of New Guinea and New Ireland, common)
- Alara dux Distant 1911 (Sri Lanka, rare)
- Alara frigida Zelazny 2011 (Papua New Guinea, Papua region, rare)
- Alara fulva Zelazny 1981 (Philippines, uncommon)
- Alara fumata (Melichar 1914) [Decora fumata] (Java, Indonesia, common)
- Alara fusca (Muir, 1915) [Mecynorhynchus fuscus] (Java, Indonesia, common)
- Alara fuscimacula Chen & Zhang 2026 (Yunnan Prov., China)
- Alara hyalina (Melichar 1914) [Mecynorhynchus hyalinus] (Luzon Isl., Philippines, uncommon)
- Alara improba Yang & Wu 1993 (Taiwan)
- Alara interrupta Zelazny 2011 (Laos, rare)
- Alara isabella Zelazny 1981 (Luzon Isl., Philippines, uncommon)
- Alara kershawi (Muir 1913) [Mecynorhynchus kershawi] (Borneo, Indonesia, rare)
- Alara laetanda Yang & Wu 1993 (Taiwan)
- Alara lingua Zelazny 2011 (Islands of New Guinea and Sulawesi, rare)
- Alara linigera Zelazny 2011 (Papua in Papua New Guinea, rare)
- Alara obscura (Muir, 1915) [Mecynorhynchus obscurus] (Java, East Malaysia, Sri Lanka, uncommon)
- Alara quatei Zelazny 1981 (Luzon Isl. and Negros Isl., Philippines, uncommon)
- Alara regia Zelazny 2011 (Borneo, Sabah, uncommon)
- Alara rubicunda Zelazny 2011 (West Papua, Indonesia, uncommon)
- Alara schmidti Zelazny 2011 (Island of New Guinea, common)
- Alara wangi Chen & Zhang 2026 (Yunnan Prov., China)
