= Turkic creation myth =

Ancient Turkic creation myth

The Turkic creation myth is an ancient story about the creation of the Gaoche (Chinese: 高車 / 高车, Pinyin: Gāochē, Wade-Giles: Kao-ch'e) (a.k.a. Tiele people) told among various Turkic peoples.

== The story ==
The tale is told in Chinese in the Book of Wei and the History of the Northern Dynasties

According to legends, the Xiongnu Chanyu had two daughters, both extremely beautiful. The people of the country all thought them to be spirits. The Chanyu said: "How could I find husbands for my daughters! I am going to give them to Heaven." Thereupon, at a desolate place in the north part of the country, he erected a high platform and placed his two daughters on the top, saying: "Oh Heaven, please come and receive them yourself!" After three years, their mother wanted to bring them back but the Chanyu said: "You may not, their time is not up yet." After another year, there was an old wolf who guarded the platform day and night, howling. It dug a hole underneath the platform and would not leave for a long time. The younger daughter said: "Our father put us here, wanting to give us to Heaven. Now this wolf came here, it is probably a heavenly being, sent by Heaven." She was about to descend and approach the wolf but her elder sister said in horror: "This is a beast! Do not bring disgrace to our parents." The younger sister did not listen to her, she descended and became the wolf's wife and gave birth to children. Later on, they multiplied and formed a state. This is why their people like to sing long-songs with a drawn-out voice, similar to the howling of wolves.

— Weishu, 103; translated by Inaba Minoru.

== See also ==
- Grey wolf (mythology)
- Turkic mythology
