= Abakhan =

Legendary khan (king) in Turkic mythology

Abakhan (Khakas: Ағбан; Turkish: Abahan; Azerbaijani: Abaxan or آباخان; Uzbek: Abakan; Kyrgyz, Mongolian: Абакан; Russian: Абака́н, Ottoman: آباحان, Tatar: آباكان) is a legendary khan (king) in Turkic mythology. He is also known as Aba Khan, Abakan or Abahan, and is considered to be the ancestor of the Khakass and Abakan peoples.

Myths about Abakhan say that he was a Khakassian warrior whose name means "Bear’s Blood". He jumped into the Abakan river, and thus gave the river and the city of Abakan their names.

== Features ==
According to Turkic myths, he lives in Altingöl (Golden Lake) and has the power of rainmaking. The warrior Aba Khan ("The Bear King"), lived in ancient times on the edge of Abakan River. He drowned in the waters of Abakan River with his horse. In the past, the totems of the Abakan peoples were bears. According to the Khakas people, the bear is a sacred animal. From the opposite bank of the Abakan River jumped the warrior Aba Khan with his horse to other side. Ursine-shaped rocks can be seen where the Small-Abakan and Large-Abakan rivers accentuate.

== Etymology ==
The word means "Bear King" or the blood of the bear. In Turkish Abi (big brother) and Aba/Apa (father, grandfather) are associated meanings. Ancient Mongolian Aba and Old Turkic "Ab" words have meanings related to hunting. The word Abakan in Anatolian Turkish means generous, honorable or dignified.
