= Susulu (mythology) =

In Turkic mythology, a Susulu (Susuna or Susona) is a legendary aquatic creature with the upper body of a female human and the tail of a fish. Also known as Suna or Sona, she is the daughter of the Sea King.

== Similarities to mermaids ==
Susulus appear in Turkic folklore as unlucky omens, both foretelling disaster and provoking it like mermaids. They are conventionally depicted as beautiful creatures with long flowing hair. They are said to inhabit lakes and rivers.

Susulus have also been described as able to swim up rivers to freshwater lakes. They are usually the ghosts of young women who died a violent or untimely death, perhaps by murder or suicide, and especially by drowning.

They appear as beautiful young women with long green hair and pale skin, suggesting a connection with floating weeds and days spent underwater in faint sunlight. They can be seen after dark, dancing together under the moon and calling out to young men by name, luring them to the water and drowning them.

== See also ==
- Mermaid
- Rusalka
