= Asena =

She-wolf in the Gokturk foundation myth

Namık İsmail's proposed coat of arms of Turkey, bearing the wolf Asena

Asena is the name of a she-wolf associated with the Göktürks' foundation myth. According to the myth, the ancestress of the Göktürks was a she-wolf, mentioned, yet unnamed in two different "Wolf Tales". The legend of Asena tells of a young boy who survived a battle; a female wolf finds the injured child and nurses him back to health. The she-wolf, impregnated by the boy, escapes her enemies by crossing the Western Sea to a cave near the Qocho mountains and a city of the Tocharians, giving birth to ten half-wolf, half-human boys. Of these, Yizhi Nishidu becomes their leader and establishes the Ashina clan, which ruled over the Göktürk and other Turkic nomadic empires.

In certain cultural narratives and mythological accounts, the character of Asena, with its symbolic association to a she-wolf, is denoted by the name "Bozkurt" (meaning "gray wolf" in Turkish), embodying a significant archetype with multifaceted connotations.

== Modern era ==
With the rise of Turkish ethnic nationalism in the 1930s, the veneration of figures of Turkic Mythology, such as Bozkurt, Asena and Ergenekon resurged.

The Turkish Air Force's Boeing KC-135 Stratotanker tanker squadron is nicknamed ''Asena''.

== See also ==
- List of wolves
- Grey wolf (mythology)
- Tiele people, whose progenitors were a gray he-wolf and a Xiongnu princess
- She-wolf (Roman mythology), a similar figure in the mythical foundation of Rome
- Romulus and Remus
