= Turkic mythology =

Myths and legends told by the Turkic people

Turkic mythology refers to myths and legends told by the Turkic people. It features Tengrist and Shamanist strata of belief along with many other social and cultural constructs related to the nomadic and warrior way of life of Turkic and Mongol peoples in ancient times. Turkic mythology shares numerous ideas and practices with Mongol mythology. Turkic mythology has also influenced other local Asiatic and Eurasian mythologies. For example, in Tatar mythology elements of Finnic and Indo-European mythologies co-exist. Beings from Tatar mythology include Äbädä, Abakhan, Alara, Şüräle, Şekä, Pitsen, Tulpar, and Zilant.

The ancient Turks apparently practised all the then-current major religions in Inner Asia, such as Tibetan Buddhism, Nestorian Christianity, Judaism, and Manichaeism, before the majority's conversion to Islam through the mediation of Persian and Central Asian culture, as well as through the preaching of Sufi Muslim wandering ascetics and mystics (fakirs and dervishes). Often these other religions were assimilated and integrated through syncretism into their prevailing native mythological tradition, way of life, and worldview. Irk Bitig, a 10th-century manuscript found in Dunhuang, is one of the most important sources for the recovery and study of Turkic mythology and religion. The book is written in Old Turkic alphabet like the Orkhon inscriptions.

== History ==
The oldest recorded belief-system of the Turks is named Tengrism. It is attested by the oldest available sources known from the inscriptions of the Kül-Tegin-Stele, which also mentions the three potentials Sky (täŋri), Earth (Yer), and human (kişi), characteristical for these beliefs. Tied to this belief is the concept of Kut and the Khan as evident in the title of Bilge Khan who is described as "the heavenly, from the sky complied noble (türk) Bilgä Khan". Especially the heavenly ruler, but also the common people are believed to be endowed with Kut. When it narrows (yuyka bol), which means it comes to an end, the person dies. It seems that besides Tengri, a number of other spirits or deities were also venerated, such Umay. It is not clear, how much of Tengrism developed in isolation, but influence from Chinese beliefs are clearly evident. Since the 8th century Turks increasingly adopted foreign (non-Central Asian) religious-systems prevalent across the Silk Road. Smaller Turkic groups, as for example in Sibirian, usually practise a form of shamanism i.e. ecstatic practises in connection to supernatural beings at disposal of social groups.

Buddhism became one of the major religions of the Turks at latest since the 8th century. Buddhist influence is still notable in modern Turkish phrases. the Turkish term "güneş tutulması" (solar eclipse) literally means "the sun is seized". The term goes back to a story from Samyutta Nikaya about a titan (asura) named Rāhu seizing the sun. After Turks converted to Islam, this story was no longer known but remained in the language of the Turks. The Northern Turkic languages, such as the Jakuts and Dolgans, speak of the "Death of the Sun" (kün ölüte) instead. Since they departed too early from Central Asia, Buddhist idioms have not influenced their language.

During the Medieval Age, most Turk tribes became Muslims. The first were the Karahanides and the Seljuks, who converted in the 10th century. In the following century they conquered Persian and Anatolia, even though they lost Persia in the 12th century again. Since Islam had no clearly defined orthodox beliefs yet, Islam merged with prevailing beliefs of the Turks. The dervish Rumi, who became highly reverted in Turkish Islamic beliefs, composed in this period his masterpiece, the Masnavi, which he believed to be "sent down" from God and understood it as the proper explanation of the Quran (tafsīr). Šams al-Dīn Aḥmad Aflākī, integrated the invading Mongols and Turks into his hagiography and stated that the Turks stopped invading at the gates of Konya due to Rumi's devotion to God and they believed that assaulting him would cause the wrath of God upon them.

Islamic beliefs played a significant role in the conquests of the Ottoman Turks. According to Ottoman historiography, Osman Gazi met the Sufi Shaykh Edebali who revealed to him victory and the lineage of a Sultan.

In the modern Turkish Republic, some authors interpreted Islamic mythological history through the lens of Turkish nationalism. Ismail Hakki Izmirli formulated theses on the alleged Turk origin of Islam. He claimed that many prophets, such as Abraham and Muhammad were probably Turks and cited various lineages through the Old Testament to construct a Turkic ethnicity of the prophets. He further claimed that the Quran entails Turkic words.

== Mythical creatures ==
- Archura, an evil forest demon.
- Qarakorshaq, a hiding animal-like creature that can be scared away by light and noise.
- Tepegöz, a cyclops-like creature with only one eye on his forehead.
- Tulpar, a winged horse.
- Yelbeghen, a creature described as a seven-headed giant or dragon.
- Dev, a giant-like creature disseminated widely in Turkic countries.
- Peri, synonymous with jinn but more frequently used in Turkish supernatural tales.

== Mythical locations ==
- Yalbuz (Bald Mountain), a mysterious and legendary mountain.
- Mount Qaf, a legendary mountain mentioned in Turkic tasawwuf.

== Gods and spirits in Turkic mythology ==
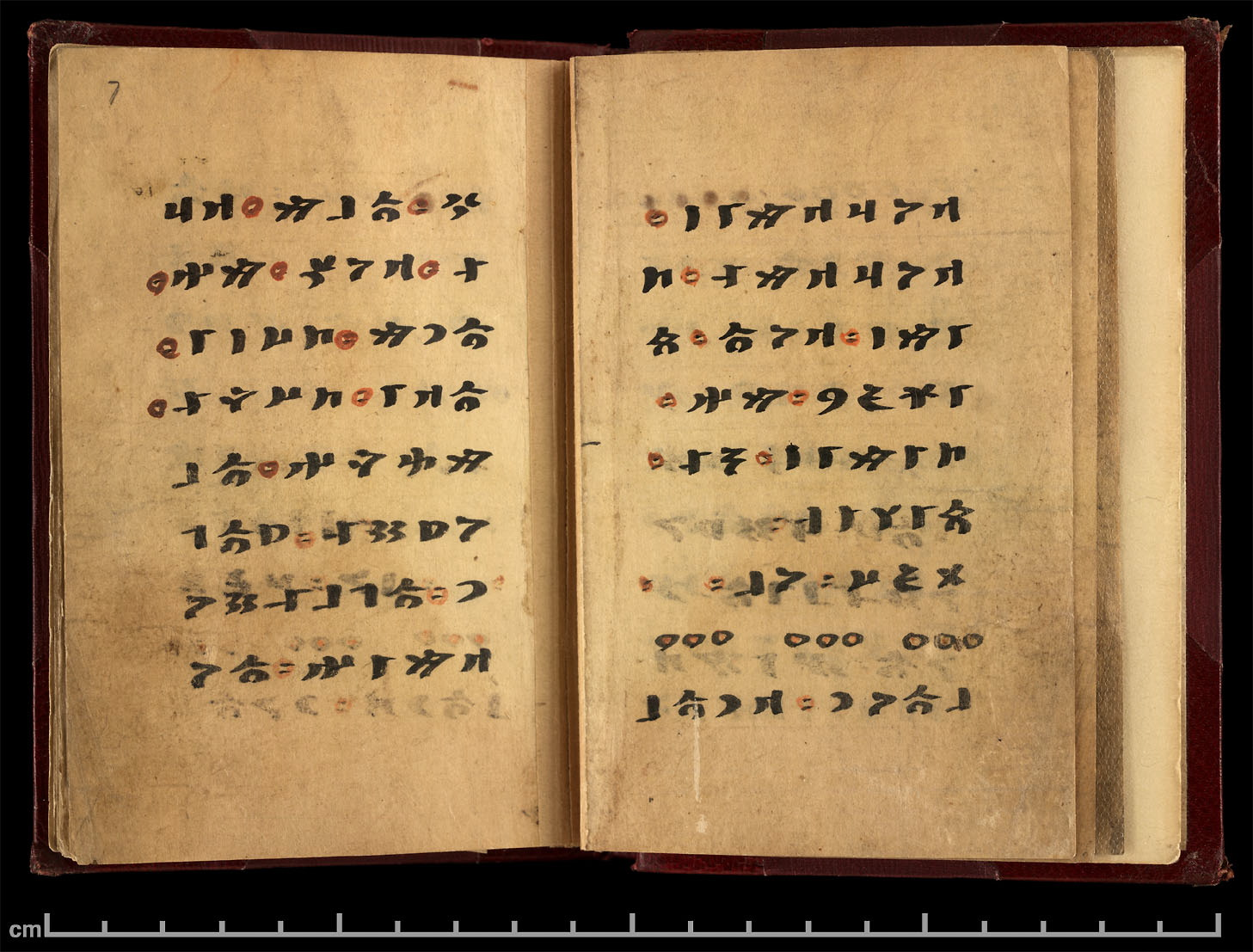
The 9th-century Irk Bitig ("Book of Divination") from Dunhuang, written in Old Uyghur language with the Orkhon script, is an important literary source for early Turko-Mongol mythology.

Turko-Mongol mythology is essentially polytheistic but became more monotheistic during the imperial period among the ruling class, and was centered around the worship of Tengri, the omnipresent Sky God. Deities are personified creative and ruling powers. Even if they are anthropomorphised, the qualities of the deities are always in the foreground.

İye are guardian spirits responsible for specific natural elements. They often lack personal traits since they are numerous. Although most entities can be identified as deities or İye, there are other entities such as genien (Çor) and demons (Abasi).

According to a common Turkic belief, the attitude of indefinite spirits is determined by their color: Good spirits appear white and evil spirits black.

=== Tengri ===
Kök Tengri is the first of the primordial deities in the religion of the early Turkic people. After the Turks started to migrate and leave Central Asia and encounter monotheistic religions, Tengrism was modified from its pagan/polytheistic origins, with only two of the original gods remaining: Tengri, representing goodness and Uçmag (a place like heaven), while Erlik represents evil and hell.

The words Tengri and Sky were synonyms and is maybe personification of the universe.

Tengri's appearance is unknown. He rules the fates of all people and acts freely, but he is fair as he awards and punishes. The well-being of the people depends on his will. The oldest form of the name is recorded in Chinese annals from the 4th century BC, describing the beliefs of the Xiongnu. It takes the form 撑犁/Cheng-li, which is hypothesized to be a Chinese transcription of Tengri.

=== Other deities ===
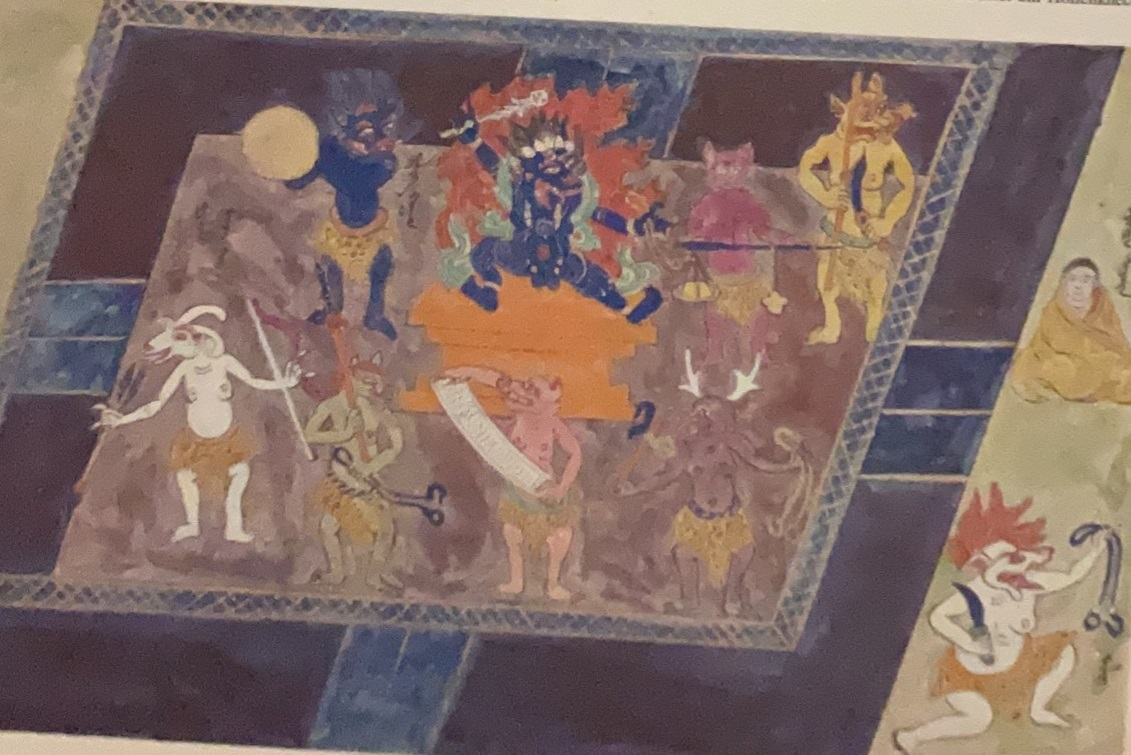
Modern Mongolian depiction of Erlik-Khan, preceding court over the souls of the dead.

Umay (The Turkic root umāy originally meant 'placenta, afterbirth') is the goddess of fertility.

Erlik (Old Turkic: 𐰀𐰼𐰠𐰃𐰚) is a deity associated with the dead and the underworld. According to the Khakas, Erlik resides in a palace in the lowest region of the netherworld. Worship of Erlik is usually frowned upon, After conversion to Islam, Erlik becomes associated with the Şeytan.

== Symbols ==
=== Horse ===
As a result of the Turks' nomadic lifestyle, the horse is also one of the main figures of Turkic mythology; Turks considered the horse an extension of the individual, particularly the male horse. This might have been the origin of the title "at-beyi" (horse-lord). As such, horses have been used in various Turkic rituals, including in funeral rites and burial practices. Turkology researcher Marat Kaldybayev has suggested that "the presence of a horse in funeral rites is one of the ethnocultural markers uniting Turkic cultures, starting from the ancient Turkic time and ending in the late Middle Ages."

=== Dragons ===
The dragon (Ejderha; Evren, also Ebren), also depicted as a snake. In Eastern Turkic myths, the dragon is a symbol of blessing and goodness.

=== Tree ===
The World Tree or Tree of Life is a central symbol in Turkic mythology, and may have its origin in Central Asia.

The tree of life connects the upper world, middle world and underworld. It is also imagined as the "white creator lord" (yryn-al-tojon).

According to the Altai Turks, human beings are actually descended from trees. According to the Yakuts, Ak Ana sits at the base of the Tree of Life, whose branches reach to the heavens and are occupied by various supernatural creatures which have been born there. Yakut myth thus combines the cosmic tree with a mother goddess into a concept of nourishing and sustaining entity.

=== Deer ===
Among animals, the deer was considered to be the mediator par excellence between the worlds of gods and men; thus at the funeral ceremony the soul of the deceased was accompanied in their journey to the underworld (Tamag) or abode of the ancestors (Uçmag) by the spirit of a deer offered as a funerary sacrifice (or present symbolically in funerary iconography accompanying the physical body) acting as psychopomp.

In the Ottoman Empire, and more specifically in western Asia Minor and Thrace the deer cult seems to have been widespread, no doubt as a result of the meeting and mixing of Turkic with local traditions. A famous case is the 13th century holy man Geyiklü Baba (ie. 'father deer'), who lived with his deer in the mountain forests of Bursa and gave hind's milk to a colleague. Material in the Ottoman sources is not scarce but it is rather dispersed and very brief, denying us a clear picture of the rites involved.

In this instance the ancient funerary associations of the deer (literal or physical death) may be seen here to have been given a new (Islamic) slant by their equation with the metaphorical death of fanaa (the Sufi practice of dying-to-self) which leads to spiritual rebirth in the mystic rapture of baqaa.

== Epics ==
=== Grey Wolf legend ===
The wolf symbolizes honor and is also considered the mother of most Turkic peoples. Ashina is the name of one of the ten sons who were given birth to by a mythical wolf in Turkic mythology.

The legend tells of a young boy who survived a raid in his village. A she-wolf finds the injured child and nurses him back to health. He subsequently impregnates the wolf which then gives birth to ten half-wolf, half-human boys. One of these, Ashina, becomes their leader and establishes the Ashina clan which ruled the Göktürks (T'u-chueh) and other Turkic nomadic empires. The wolf, pregnant with the boy's offspring, escaped her enemies by crossing the Western Sea to a cave near to the Qocho mountains, one of the cities of the Tocharians. The first Turks subsequently migrated to the Altai regions, where they are known as experts in ironworking.

=== Ergenekon legend ===
The Ergenekon legend tells about a great crisis of the ancient Turks. Following a military defeat, the Turks took refuge in the legendary Ergenekon valley where they were trapped for four centuries. They were finally released when a blacksmith created a passage by melting a mountain, allowing the gray wolf to lead them out. A New Year's ceremony commemorates the legendary ancestral escape from Ergenekon.

=== Korkut Ata stories ===
The Book of Dede Korkut from the 11th century covers twelve legendary stories of the Oghuz Turks, one of the major branches of the Turkic peoples. It originates from the state of Oghuz Yabghu period of the Turks, from when Tengriist elements in the Turkic culture were still predominant. It consists of a prologue and twelve different stories. The legendary story which begins in Central Asia is narrated by a dramatis personae, in most cases by Korkut Ata himself. Korkut Ata heritage (stories, tales, music related to Korkut Ata) represented by Azerbaijan, Kazakhstan and Turkey was included in the Representative List of the Intangible Cultural Heritage of Humanity of UNESCO in November 2018 as an example of multi-ethnic culture.

=== The Prince and Three demons ===
A Uighur Manichaean text fragment narrates a story about a prince and three demons. The demons quarrel over three magical items: a cap which turns people invisible, sandals which can bring people to any place they wish, and staff which belongs to the sandals. The demons request the prince to distribute the magical items among the demons. Therefore, he shots three arrows into three different directions and claims that the demon who brings back an arrow first will receive the cap, the second one the staff, and the third will receive the sandals. Once the demons start chasing the arrows, the prince puts on the cap on his head and vanishes with the power of the sandals and the staff.

=== Epic of King Gesar in Turkic peoples ===
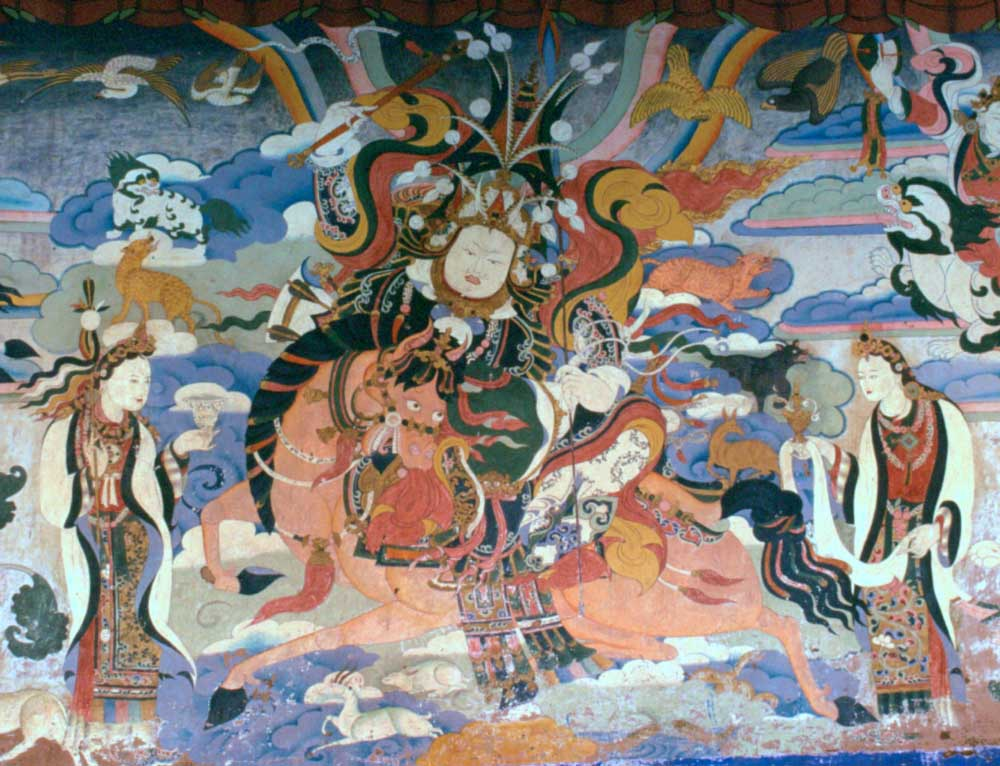
Mural depicting King Gesar of Ling

They conclude that the stories of the Gesar cycle were well known in the territory of the Uyghur Khaganate.

== Orkhon inscriptions and creation narrative ==
The Old Turkic Orkhon inscriptions tells about Father-Heaven and Mother Earth giving raise to Mankind (child):

"When the blue Heaven above and the brown Earth beneath arose, between the twain Mindkind arose."

== See also ==
- Finnic mythology
- Hungarian mythology
- Mongol mythology
- Manchu mythology
- Tibetan mythology
- Scythian mythology
- Shamanism in Siberia
- Turkish folklore
- Susulu (mythology)
- Turkic creation myth
