= Yalbuz =

Legendary mountain in Turkic mythology

Yalbuz or Albuz, as an adjective Taz-Dagh (Tas-Tav, Taz-Tağ, Daz-Dağ, Taskıl Dağ or Tazkıl Dağ; means Bald Mountain), is a mysterious and legendary mountain in Turkic mythology. It is also known as Mount Elbrus.

== Sources ==
- Türk Mitolojisi Ansiklopedik Sözlük, Celal Beydili, Yurt Yayınevi
