= Äbädä =

Forest spirit from Tatar mythology

Äbädä (Cyrillic: Әбәдә) is an innocent forest spirit in Turkic mythology. It looks like an old woman. Äbädä also is represented in mythologies of Siberian peoples.

Äbädä is a demon or spirit. He is a Turkic forest being, similar in nature to the İyes. He protects the birds, trees, and animals of the forest; he appears in the shape of a human with blue skin, two great horns, green hair, and a long green beard across his face, carrying a club or whip indicating his mastery of the forest. He can shapeshift into many different forms. As a human, he looks like a peasant with glowing eyes, and his shoes are on backwards. Should one ever encounter an Äbädä, one must thwart him immediately by turning all one's clothes inside out and backwards, and placing one's shoes on the opposite feet.

== See also ==
- Archura
- Bichura
