= Bies =

Evil spirit or demon in Slavic mythology

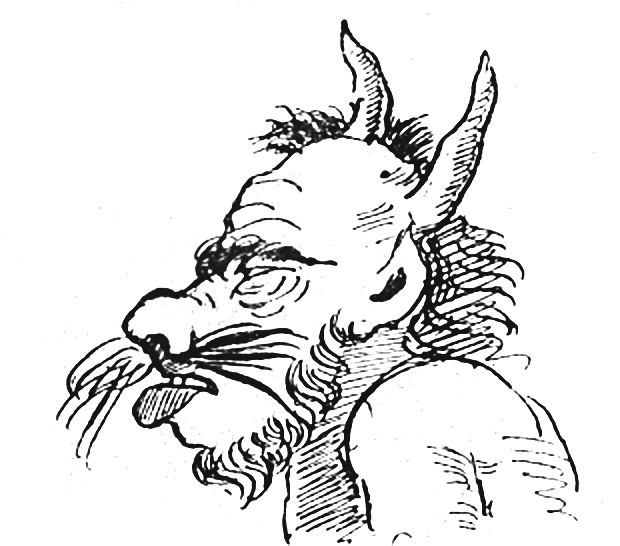

Bies /ˈbjɛs/ (Polish), bes (Russian: бес [ˈbʲɛs], Slovene, Montenegrin) or bijes (Bosnian, Croatian) is an evil spirit or demon in Slavic mythology. Under the influence of Christianity the word often became synonymous with chort.

After the acceptance of Christianity the bies (same as chort or czort) became identified with the devil, corresponding to the being referred to in Ancient Greek, as either daimon (δαίμων), daimónion or pneuma (πνεῦμα). For example, biesy (Russian plural of bies) is used in the standard Russian translation of Mark 5:12, where we have the devils entering the swine in KJV. Compare to Ukrainian bisy or bisytysia and Polish zbiesić się (to go mad). In Slovenian (bes), Croatian (bijes) and Serbian (bes) the word means "rage", "fury". It comes from the proto-Slavic běsъ.

== Equivalents in non-Slavic traditions ==
In the mythology of Jah Hut people, one of the Orang Asli tribes living in Malaysia, there are beings called bès. This word generally refers to dangerous spirits living in the jungle and often attacking people, causing illnesses by spirit possession etc. It is possible to tame them by carving "sepili" - small wooden sculptures depicting the bès one has troubles with. If the bès likes its look, they may move into the sculpture in which moment they can be trapped inside by a special ritual. After it is done, people must make sure to get the sepili as far away from their village as possible to avoid bès' anger once they break free. Traditionally, they bury the sepili deep in the jungle. Nowadays, many native artists also sell their sepili as souvenirs to tourists.

== Examples in culture ==
- In Alexander Pushkin's The Tale of the Priest and of His Workman Balda, there is a scene in which Balda has to force the "devils" (черти, Chorti) of the sea to pay an ancient rent, and interacts with an "Old Bies" who is their leader and his grandson. It is also the title of his poem "Demons" (Бесы).
- The original Russian title of Fyodor Dostoevsky's novel known in its English translation as The Possessed is Besy (Бесы) (Russian plural of bes), i.e., more literally, The Evil Spirits.
- Fyodor Sologub’s most famous novel was Мелкий бес (The Petty Demon, 1907)
- The Black Tapes
- In the 2015 videogame The Witcher 3: Wild Hunt, fiends (called bies in the original version) are massive horned predators who possess hypnotic and self-healing powers.
- In Ivana Brlić-Mažuranić's Croatian Tales of Long Ago "bjesovi" appear.
