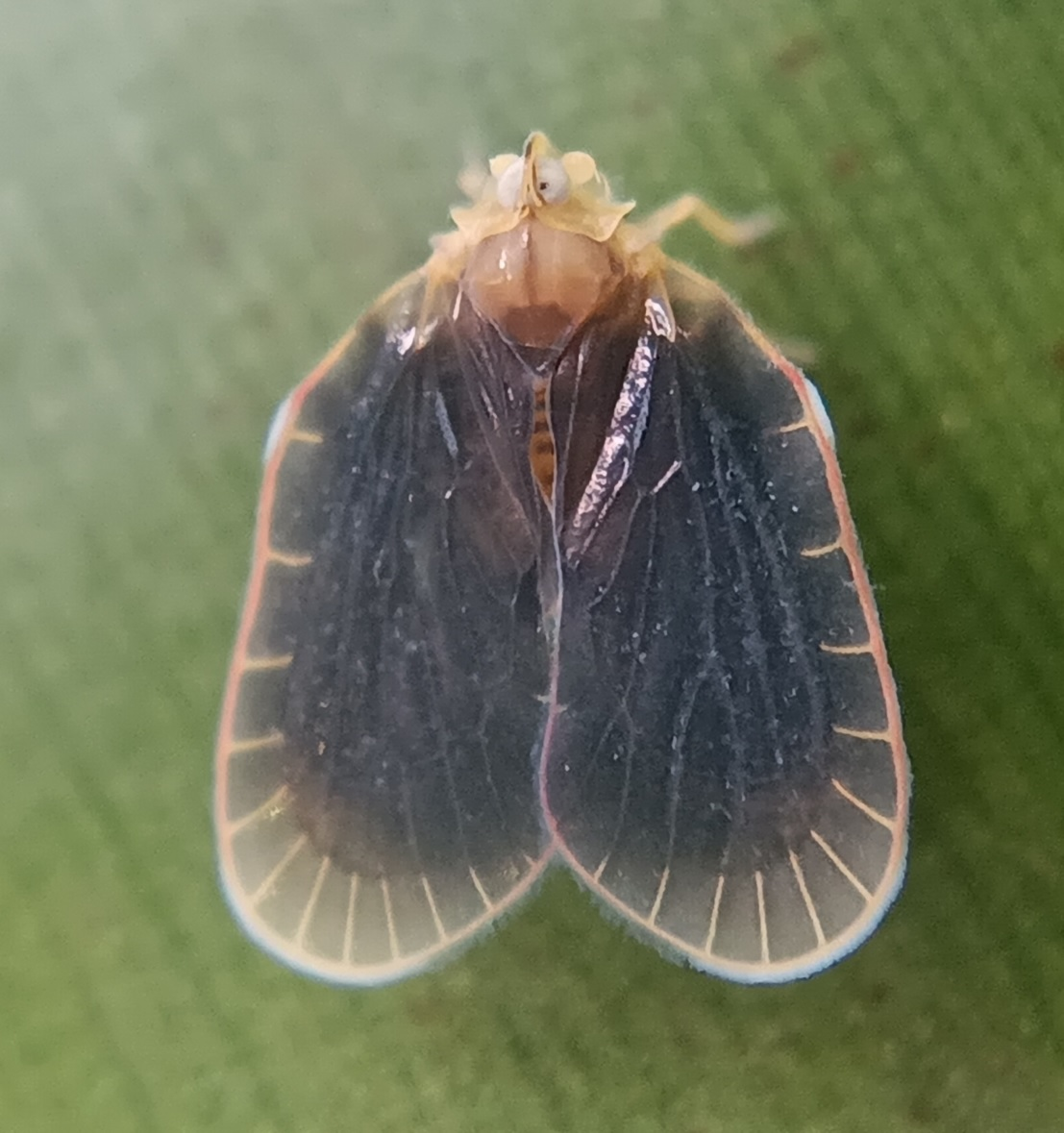
- A species of Alara from Ifugao Province, Philippines, possibly Alara isabella

Scientific classification
- Kingdom: Animalia
- Phylum: Arthropoda
- Clade: Pancrustacea
- Class: Insecta
- Order: Hemiptera
- Suborder: Auchenorrhyncha
- Infraorder: Fulgoromorpha
- Family: Derbidae
- Subfamily: Otiocerinae
- Tribe: Rhotanini
- Genus: Alara; Distant 1911

Type species
- Alara dux Distant, 1911

Synonyms
- Mecynorhynchus Muir, 1913

= Alara (planthopper) =

Genus of planthopper

Alara is a genus of small planthoppers from the family Derbidae, tribe Rhotanini, with more than 30 species. The species are found mainly in New Guinea, other parts of Indonesia, Borneo and the Philippines. However, some species have been also reported from Sri Lanka, parts of mainland Asia, Taiwan and Australia. The adult hoppers are around 4 mm long from head to the end of the wings. The forewings are nearly oval in outline with 5 broad costal cells that gradually decrease in length from the base to the tip of the wings. The antennae and the rostrum are longer than in other genera of Rhotanini. The forewings are often dark brown and lack any bright colours. However, there may be red marks on the head. When the insects are at rest, the wing surfaces form a common plane like in house flies.

== Distribution ==
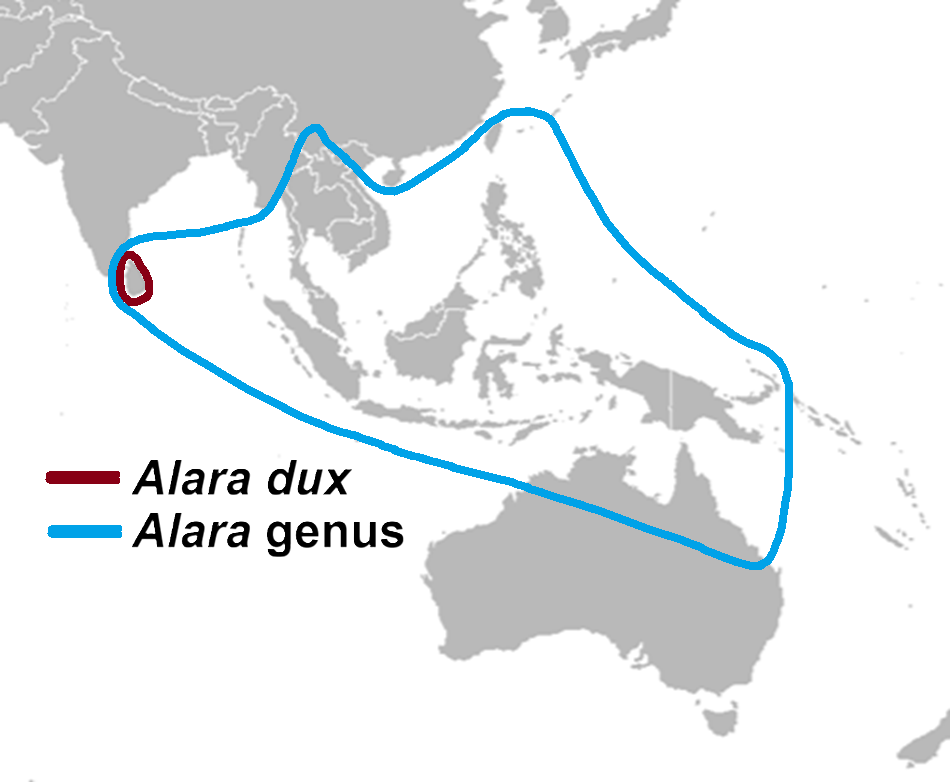
Distribution ranges of the species in the genus Alara (blue outline) and that of Alara dux, the type species (brown outline)

In the genus Alara, the largest number of species have been reported from the island of New Guinea, including the Indonesian part and neighbouring islands like New Ireland and New Britain (10 species). The genus is also well represented in other parts of Indonesia, the Philippines and Borneo. Further, species of Alara are found in Sri Lanka, West Malaysia, Laos, south-western part of mainland China, Taiwan and Queensland (Australia). Most species of Alara, like the type species, are found in a very restricted geographical area only. However, a few have a wider distribution range. For example, Alara obscura (Muir, 1915) has been recorded from Sri Lanka, Java and Borneo.

== Description ==
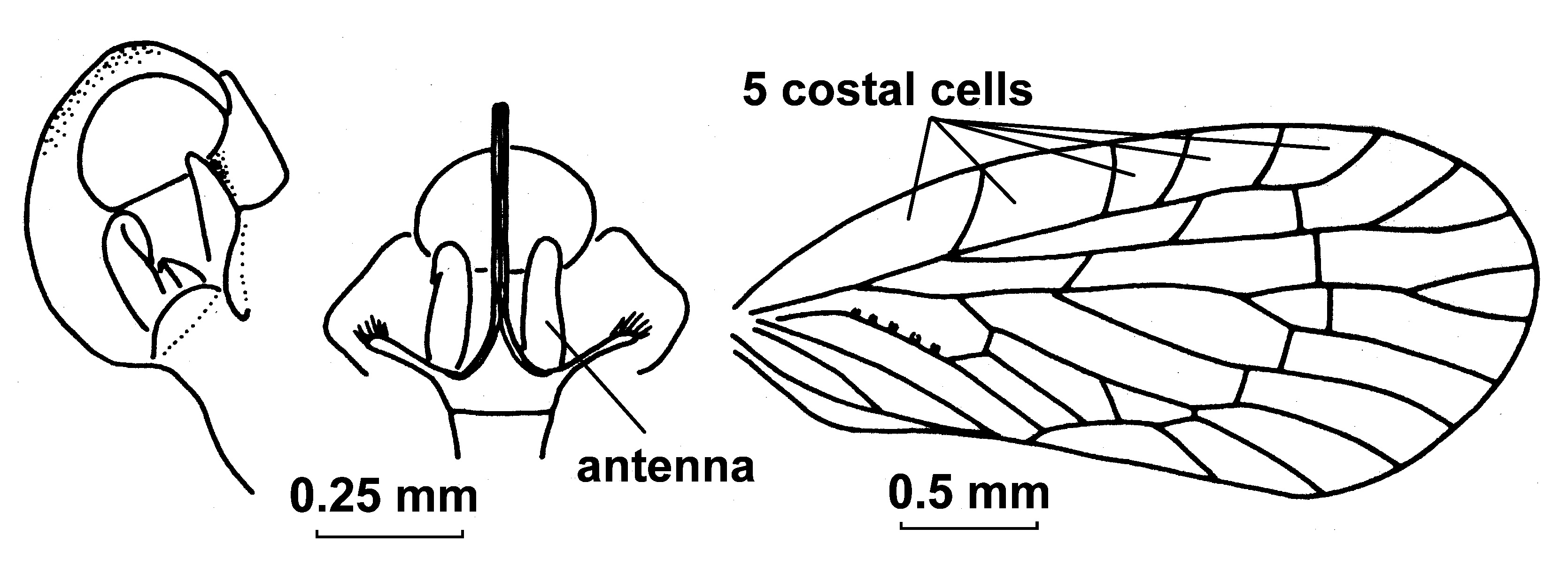
Alara anulus, head (side and frontal view) and forewing

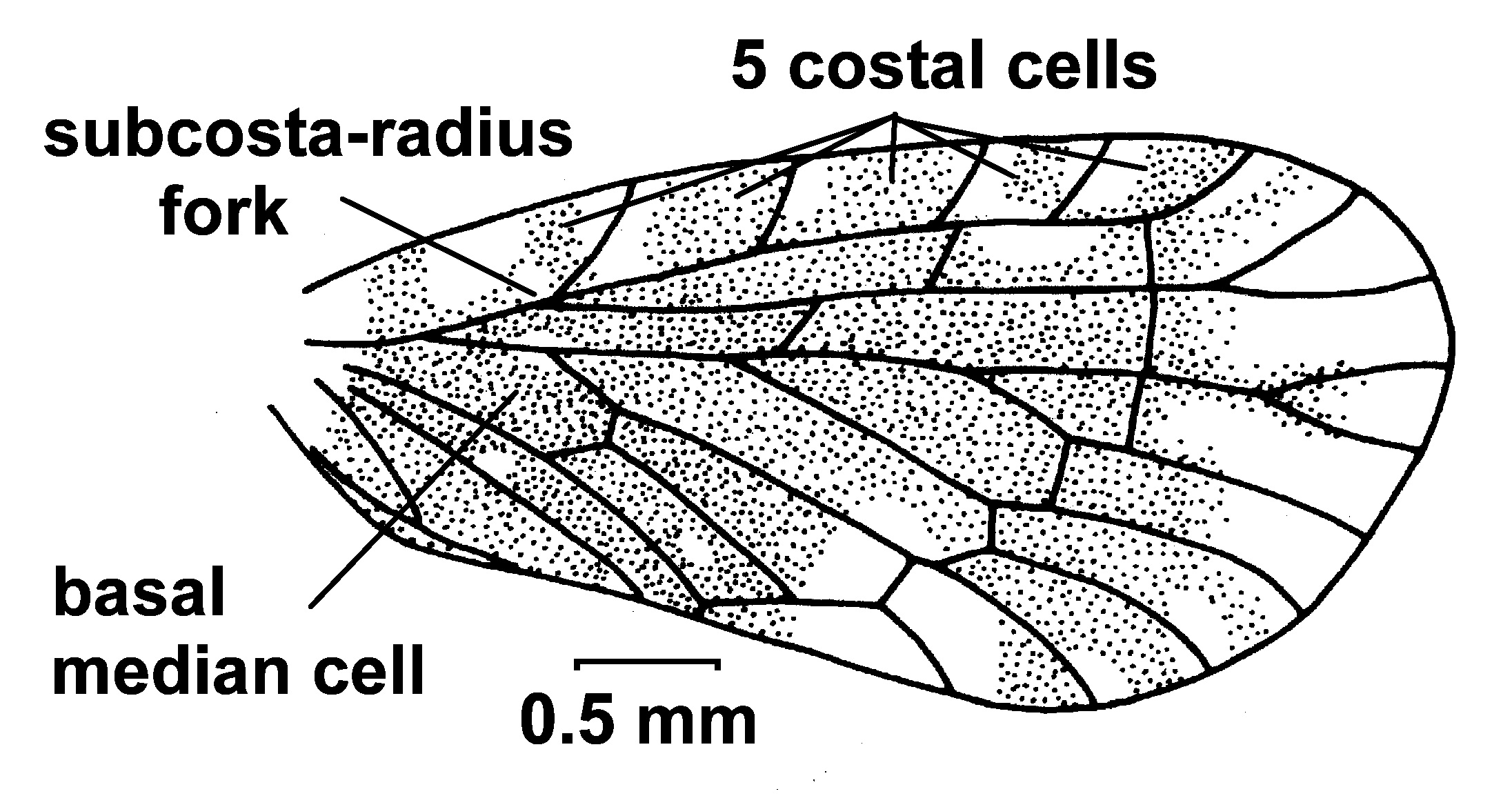
Forewing of Alara dux (type species) showing 5 costal cells, the subcosta-radius fork and the basal median cell

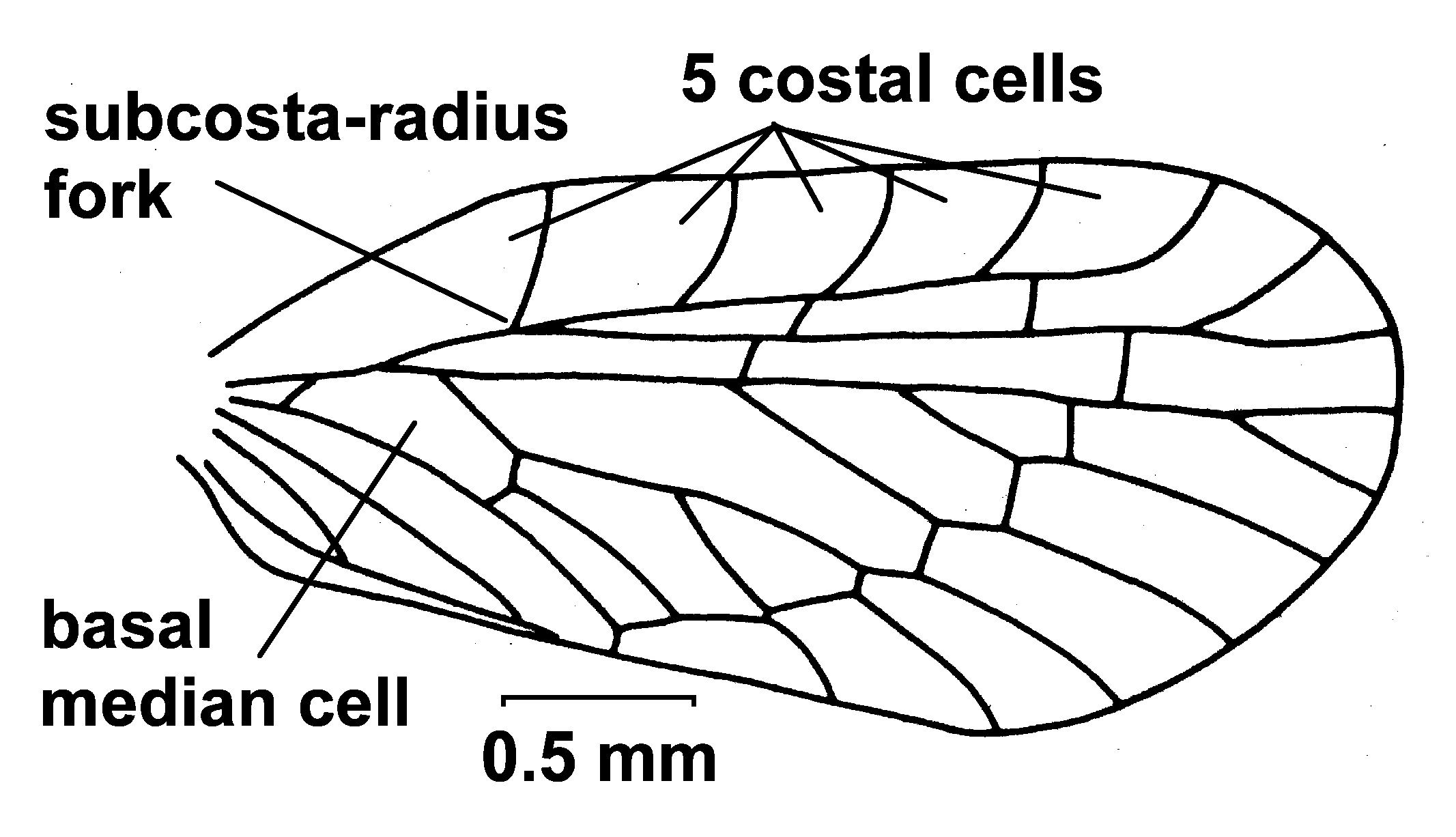
Forewing of Alara obscura showing 5 costal cells, the subcosta-radius fork and the basal median cell

The characteristic features of the genus Alara are:

- The forewings have 5 broad costal cells which decrease gradually in length from the base of the wing to its tip,
- the forewings have an approximately oval shape,
- the subcosta-radius fork is close to the base of the forewing,
- the rostrum is longer than in other genera of Rhotanini, often reaching the middle or the end of the abdomen,
- the hind wings are often narrower than in other genera of Rhotanini with a larger stridulation plate,
- the antenna are often elongated (see the image of Alara anulus in the taxobox).

In profile, the head is evenly rounded in most species of Alara and the foliar ridges on the sides of the face meet in front of the eyes. The forewings are slightly powdered and form a common plane when the insects are at rest. In many species, the forewings are uniformly coloured dark brown, see image above in taxobox. While some parts of the forewing veins may be red, there are usually few if any marks on the forewings. The body is mainly brownish or straw-coloured. However, there may be red marks on the side of the head and the antennae are bright red in two species (Alara armifera, A. schmidti).

== Biology ==
Like in other genera of the Rhotanini, there is very little information on the biology of the species of Alara. It is assumed that the nymphal stages live in decaying organic matter like other derbids, feeding on fungi. Information is even scarce on the host plants the adults feed on. Some species have been collected from coconut and other palms, as well as from Musa species, ginger, and Alpinia species.

== Species ==
As of 2024, a total of 31 species of Alara have been described. Most of them are not common and restricted to relatively small geographic areas. For example, only one specimen of the type species, Alara dux, has been collected. However, other species are more common and these include:

- Alara alboapicalis in the Philippines
- Alara armilla islands of New Guinea (PNG, Indonesia), New Britain and New Ireland
- Alara castanea in the Philippines
- Alara cultellus in New Guinea and New Ireland
- Alara fumata in Java, Indonesia
- Alara fusca in Java, Indonesia
- Alara schmidti in New Guinea

For other species see the complete list of Alara species.
