= Dydko =

Polish supernatural creature

Dydko (also didko, ditko, dytko, dydo) is a supernatural creature from Polish folklore that was originally a demon from Slavic beliefs, later relegated to the role of a bogeyman. The figure of a Dydko derives from the house guardian demon known in Russia (cf. domowik), degraded after Christianization to the role of a devil, especially a forest devil, and finally to the role of the night scarecrow who was scared of children (cf. bobo). Dydko is pictured as an awkward figure with a large head, usually on straw legs similar to spider legs. According to later beliefs, Dydko appears in the mirror to virgins who spent too much time in front of the mirror. He is believed to appear between midnight and 3:30 a.m., and to produce a disgusting slurping sound.

== Etymology ==
The Russian дідько [ˈdʲidʲkɔ], the Ukrainian did'ko, is associated with the Ukrainian word meaning grandfather. The homonymy of Dydko with the domestic spirit with the demon from Smolensk by the same name is sometimes emphasized. Kolberg describes the burning of straw after the Christmas carol with the use of spells to drive away Dydko, distinguishing between Did and Dydko.

== In modern fiction ==
=== Literature ===
- Didko by Maria Konopnicka on Wikisource.
