= Sheka (mythology) =

Sheka (Cyrillic: Шекә) is a dwarf-like being in the Turkic mythology, that lives in forests or derelict houses. In the legends they tend to appear in comical situations.

Sheka in Slavic paganism is field spirit that appears as a deformed dwarf with different coloured eyes and grass instead of hair. It appears either at noon or sunset and wear either all black or all white suits. According to local beliefs it leads wandering people in a field astray, give them diseases or ride them over with horses if they are found asleep. It enjoys pulling the hair of peasants working in the midday. It also makes little children get lost in cornfields. If it catches a person it forces him to sing, which lasts for hours.
