= Epic of Ergenekon =

Origin myth of Mongolic and Turkic peoples

The Epic of Ergenekon or Ergenekon Epic (sometimes Ergeneqon; Mongolian: Эргүнэ хун, romanized: Ergüne khun) is a founding myth among Mongolic and Turkic peoples.

== Etymology ==
There are conflicting etymological theories about the origin of the word Ergenekon. According to the Kazakh philologist Nemat Kelimebov and other Turkic-origin advocates, Ergenekon is a portmanteau derived from Old Turkic roots ergene "fording point, passage, mountain gorge" and kon "encampment, place of living" and can be translated as "encampment (of cattle breeders) in a mountain gorge".

According to academics such as the Russian linguist Zoriktuev, who attribute the myth originally to Mongolic peoples, the name was derived from the Argun River (Ergune) and kun, which in the Old Mongolian language meant a high plateau with steep slopes.

== Variants ==
=== Turkic version ===
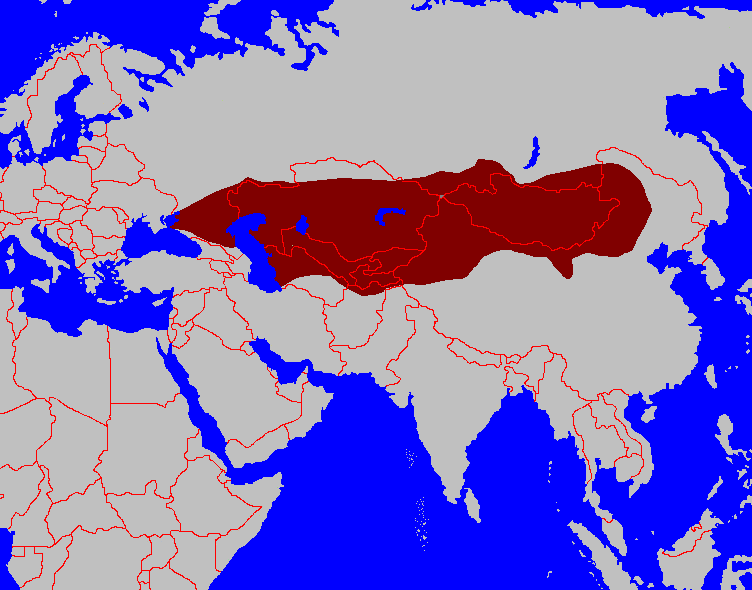
Extent of the First Turkic Khaganate in AD 600

In the Turkic mythology, the myth aims to explain the foundation of the First Turkic Khaganate. The Ergenekon legend tells about a great crisis of the ancient Turks. Following a military defeat, the Turks took refuge in the legendary Ergenekon valley where they were trapped for four centuries. They were finally released when a blacksmith created a passage by melting the mountain, allowing the gray wolf Asena to lead them out. The people led out of the valley founded the Turkic Khaganate, with the valley functioning as its capital. A New Year's ceremony commemorates the legendary ancestral escape from Ergenekon.

=== Mongolic version ===
In the Mongolic version, Ergenekon was the refuge of the progenitors of the Mongols, Nekuz and Qiyan (according to Abulghazi Bahadur, nephew and son of Il-Khan respectively), as told in the 14th-century literary history Jāmiʿ al-tawārīkh, written by Rashid-al-Din Hamadani. It is a common epic in Mongol mythologies.

Abulghazi Bahadur, khan of the Khanate of Khiva (1643–1663), told of the Ergenekon Mongolian creation myth in his work, 17th-century "Shajara-i Turk" (Genealogy of the Turks).

== In Turkish literature ==
=== Ottoman Era ===
In the late Ottoman era, the Ergenekon epic enjoyed use in Turkish literature (especially by the Turkish nationalist movement), describing a mythical Turkic place of origin located in the inaccessible valleys of the Altay Mountains. In 1864 Ahmed Vefik Pasha translated Shajara-i Turk into the Ottoman language under the title Şecere-i Evşâl-i Türkiyye, published in Tasvir-i Efkâr newspaper.

Ziya Gökalp's poem put the Ergenekon epic in the context of Turkic history (Turkish text), published as "Türk An'anesi: Ergenekon" in Türk Duygusu magazine from May 8 to June 5, 1913, Altın Armağan in September 1913, and under the title of "Ergenekon" in Kızılelma, 1914. Ömer Seyfettin's poem on the topic was published in Halka Doğru magazine, April 9, 1914. Rıza Nur translated Shajara-i turk into modern Turkish in 1925, and mentioned Ergenekon in Oğuznâme, published in Alexandria, 1928.

=== Foundation of the Turkish Republic ===
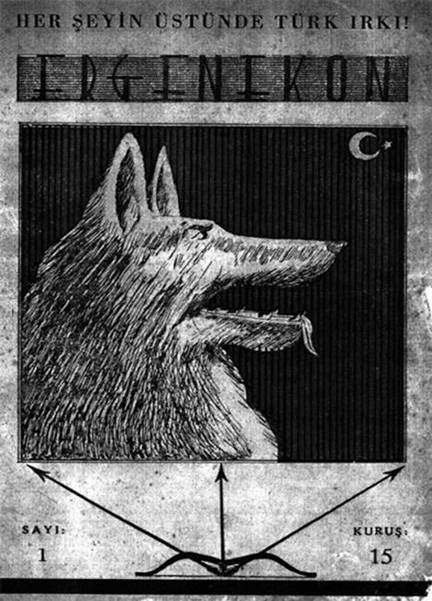
First issue of Ergenekon magazine, 1938

The first author to connect the mythology of Ergenekon to the founding of the Turkish Republic in 1923 was Yakup Kadri Karaosmanoğlu. Karaosmanoğlu was the author of several essays about the Turkish War of Independence. His interpretation of the myth bolstered its place in the founding mythology of the modern Turkish nation-state.

The myth itself was a story about the survival of the Turkic people who, faced with extinction, were able to escape with the help of their totem god, the bozkurt "wolf". The wolf remains a potent symbol of Turkish nationalism into the present day. Even the renowned Turkish dissident poet Nazim Hikmet lauded Mustafa Kemal Atatürk as a "blonde wolf" in the poem titled Kuva-yi Milliye. While the original Ergenekon myth was about the survival of the ancient Turkic people, in its Republican form it carried the symbolism of Turkey's national self-determination.

During the early republican era of Turkey (especially in the 1930s, when ethnic nationalism held its sway in Turkey), the tale of the Bozkurt, Asena and Ergenekon were promoted along with Pan-Turkism, and included in history textbooks as the Göktürk creation myth.

In 1933, Şevket Süreyya Aydemir, a Turkish intellectual and a founder and key theorist of the Kadro movement, consubstantiated the Ergenekon epic with the Turkish revolution. In the new Turkish version of the Egenekon Legend, the motif of the wolf was added (Turkish text, version of Ministry of National Education of Turkey).

== Comparisons ==
According to Ergün Candan, there are some similarities between the mythologies of other cultures in their symbolism. The she-wolf Asena showed the Turks the way through the labyrinth of valleys and mountain passes. According to Ergün Candan, the she-wolf may be seen as a symbol of the "dog star" Sirius.

== External sources ==
- Scharlipp, Wolfgang E. (2020). "Ergenekon". In Fleet, Kate; Krämer, Gudrun; Matringe, Denis; Nawas, John; Rowson, Everett (eds.). Encyclopaedia of Islam (3rd ed.). Brill Online. ISSN 1873-9830.
- Ergenekon at WikiSource (Turkish) (the version of the Ministry of National Education of Turkey)
