= Bichura, Amur Oblast =

Bichura Бичура
- Selo
- Location within Amur Oblast Location within Russia
- Coordinates: 51°22′N 128°50′E
- Country: Russia
- Region: Amur Oblast
- District: Mazanovsky District
- Time zone: UTC+9:00

Bichura (Russian: Бичура) is a rural locality (selo) in Dmitriyevsky Selsoviet of Mazanovsky District, Amur Oblast, Russia. The population was 134 as of 2018. There are 5 streets.

== Geography ==
Bichura is located on the left bank of the Birma River, 40 km south of Novokiyevsky Uval (the district's administrative centre) by road. Sapronovo is the nearest rural locality.
