= Chort =

Anthropomorphic malign spirit or demon in Slavic folk tradition

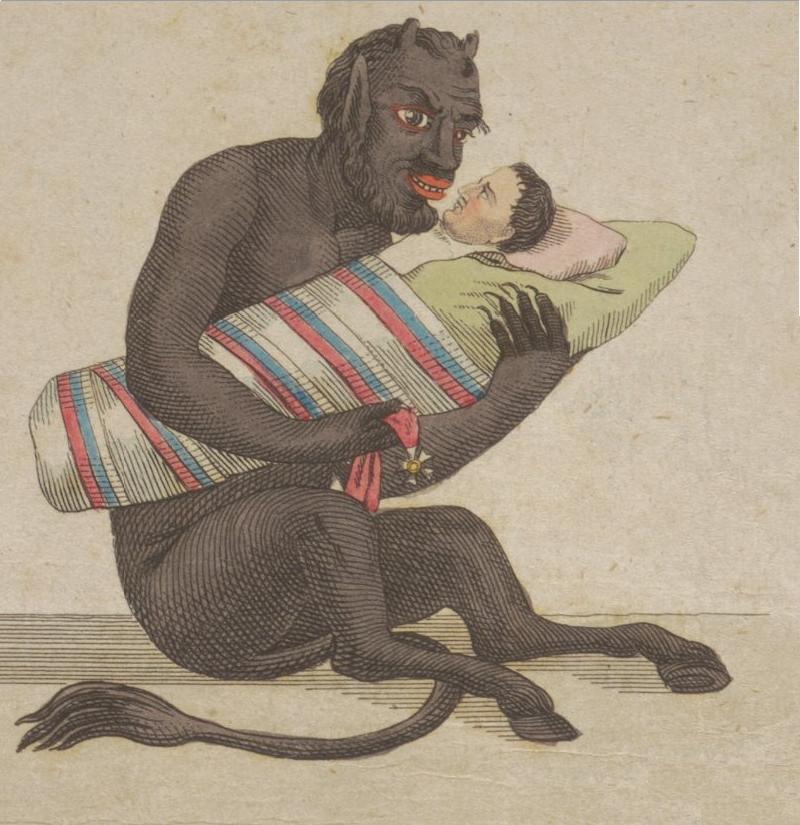
Caricature of Napoleon with a chort

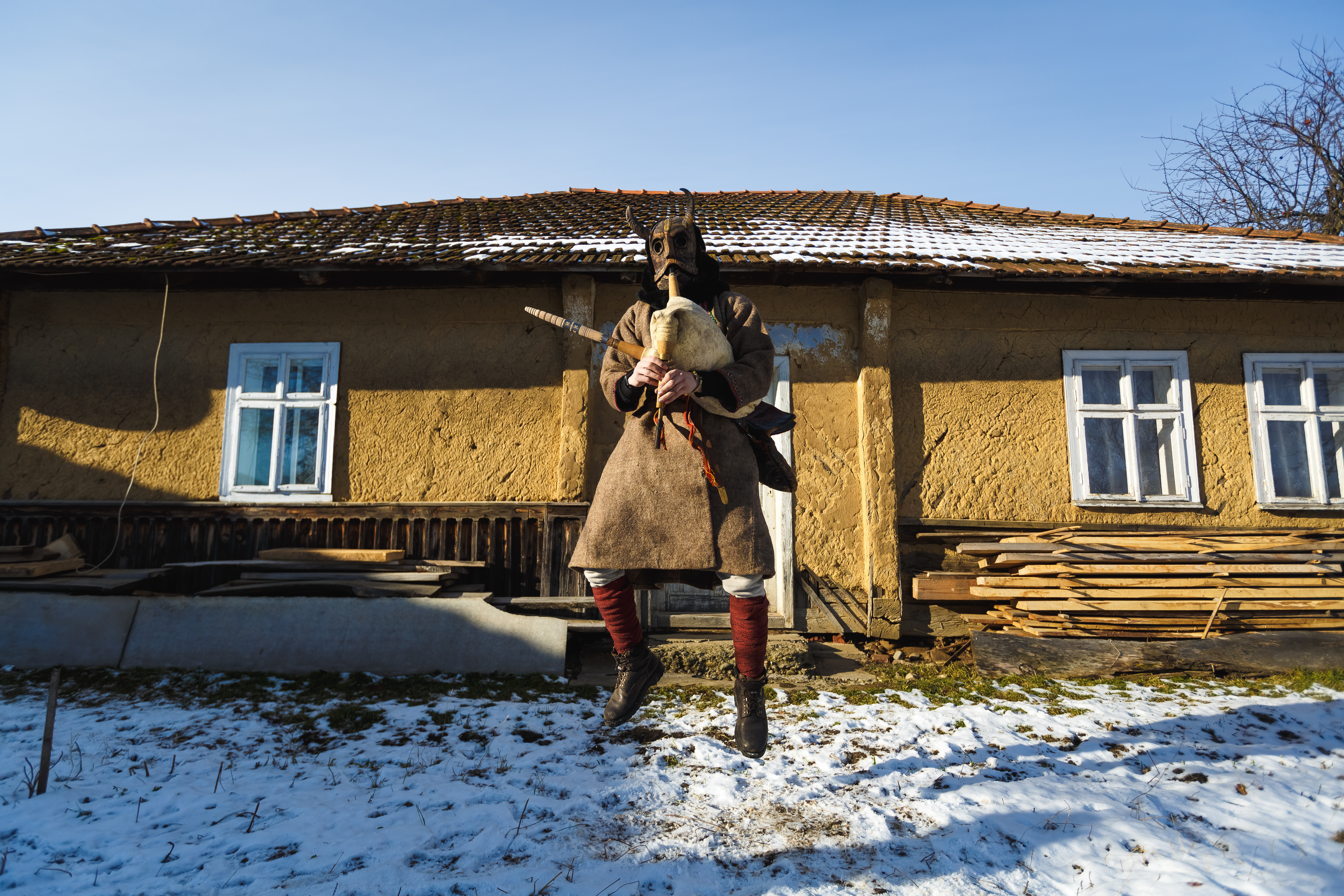
A Ukrainian dressed as a czort on Malanka

A chort (Russian: чёрт, Belarusian and Ukrainian: чорт, Serbo-Croatian: čort or črt, Polish: czart and czort, Czech and Slovak: čert, Slovene: črt) is an anthropomorphic malign spirit or demon in Slavic folk tradition. Chorts are often depicted identically to Christian devils, with horns, hooves, and a skinny tail. In Slavic mythology, a singular chort is sometimes identified as a son of the god Chernobog and the goddess Mara. In folk Christianity, they are considered lesser minions of Satan.

The word is used in various Russian expressions (curses): чёрт побери (chort poberi) – meaning "be taken by the demon" (often used as an exclamation to express frustration or pain as in English "darn!", "rats!", "shit!", etc., or as an acceptable version of cursing in Eastern Europe); чёрт попутал (chort poputal) – meaning mixed up by the demon; к чертям (k chertyam) – meaning to hell, and many others.

== Etymology ==
There are many theories regarding the origins of the Proto-Slavic word *čьrtъ. One is that it is the past passive participle of an unattested verb (nouns: *čarъ, *čara ("magic, sorcery")) that is the exact equivalent of the Lithuanian kerė́ti ("to bewitch"). This etymology is supported by analogies, cf. *vȏrgъ ("foe, enemy; evil spirit") > *voržiti ("to divine). This makes it a cognate with Sanskrit कृत्या (kṛtyā, "female demon, sorceress"). Another is that it is a substantivized t-participle of *ker- (to cut, to chop), which could be derived from a chort imagined as being lame (having one leg shorter). Words like the Ukrainian kutsyi and Czech and Slovak kusý are some of chort's most common epithets. According to another hypothesis, Proto-Slavic *čьrtъ represents a derivative of *čersti / čьrtǫ ‘to draw a line, furrow’. One way to interpret this derivation is reconstructing *čьrtъ as a supernatural Draughtsman in charge of determining human fate. Under this hypothesis, the original god of destiny came to be perceived as the bringer of death and then syncretised with the embodiment of all evil in the Christian tradition. In Ukrainian, chorts are also known as haspyda, didko, irod, and kutsyi. The Polish version of the word is czart.

== In Czech and Slovak culture ==
In Czech and Slovak folk tales, čert is not an evil character per se. It is often trying to tease characters into selling their souls in exchange for something (money, power, completion of a task). This often ends badly for evil or greedy characters, who are tricked into getting useless gifts and then are carried into hell. Other times, čert changes roles from trickster to tricked as he loses a bet against a hero, who outsmarts him, winning his soul back. This way, čert is often tricked to build castle walls in a day, dig fish ponds or even whole river banks, move large stones or create hills and mountains. Sometimes, a positive role of čert is further emphasized, namely in modern or modernized folk tales. Čert is trying to bring evil characters to hell, he often helps or befriends heroes in this process and gives them various magical items and treasures.

The true form of Čert is often a smallish hairy man with a tail, horns and one or two hoofs. But he is a shapeshifter and he tries to trick characters in his nicer forms, before they even realize what he is. In these forms, he is often represented as pretty young man, count, or huntsman. Often, this transformation is not (and cannot be) complete, so one can recognize čert by small horns hidden in black curly hair, or a single hoofed leg hidden in high boots.

Čert is not the devil, although they might have a lot in common. Sometimes, hell is full of čerts and is ruled by the devil (or archdevil) Lucifer.

== In Turkic culture ==
In Turkic (usually neighboring Slavic) folklore its name is "Çor" (Chor). In Anatolia known as "Çorabaş" (Chorabash). Chors are spiritual creatures mentioned in the pre-Islamic texts and oral tradition who inhabit an unseen world in dimensions beyond the visible universe of humans. Influenced by the later influences of Islamic jinn and devils, folk narratives mention that the Chors are made of fire, but also physical in nature, being able to interact physically with people and objects and likewise be acted upon. Like human beings, the Chor can also be good (Ak-çor, literally "White Chor"), evil (Kara-çor, "Black Chor"), or neutrally benevolent. The exorcist is called "Çoraman" (Choraman) in Anatolia. There are two different kinds of Chura: Arçura, that comes from the forest and is married to the Orman iyesi, and Biçura, that comes from the cellar and is married to Ev iyesi.

== In Ukrainian culture ==
In Ukrainian folklore, the Chort or demon often acts as a generalised concept for "unclean forces", and, as such, can substitute for a wide variety of demonic beings. Despite the significant influence of folk-christian worldviews, several of its features can be traced to archaic Slavic demonology, associated with ideas about the afterlife and zoolatric beliefs.

Chorts are depicted as anthropomorphic creatures, their features including fur, a snout, a tail, horns, animal-like backwards knees, hooves or bird feet (usually described as "chicken" or "stork" feet), and claws. Their eyes and tongue are said to be of a "hellish" colour. They often hide their "inhuman" features under clothing.

In most cases, the common perception of demons in Ukrainian folklore is casual and down-to-earth: the Chort is primarily characterised as a failed demon, moreso than an evil one. It has a developed imagination, but is deprived of the ability to use it effectively. The Chort is credited with creating things that villagers commonly consider to be negative: vodka, tobacco, cliffs, ravines, etc. In some legends, it is credited for the creation of horses, too, allowing them to sense when evil spirits are nearby. Chorts are said to be found on territories which are considered "spiritually unclean"— ‌most often cemeteries, swamps, abandoned places, crossroads, bridges, places of a person's untimely death, etc.

Common scenarios which include Chorts in Ukrainian folklore involve fooling villagers by causing leaves and sticks to appear as expensive objects, disguising themselves as gentlemen and seducing young women, making them waste away, replacing human children with their own, shapeshifting, most often appearing as a sheep or a ram, but occasionally as a cat, dog, hare, or snake, excessively weighing down a person's shoulders or cart, and scaring people who flaunt their fearlessness.

According to Hutsul beliefs, demonic beings have a certain hierarchy. The oldest is the Aridnyk — the supreme spirit of the otherworld, alternatively known as "Triyuda", "Yuda", "Satan", "Bida", and "Irod". He is known in different parts of the Hutsul region as "Pekun", "Osynivets", "Skusnyk", and "Klopotnyk". The wide variety of names is attributed to the local dislike for the use of the word “chort”, as it is believed to attracts evil spirits. Ordinary devils—‌dydkos, demons, yudniks, and shchezniks—‌are subordinate to him.

One belief from the region states that a Chort can be tamed and trained. It could be bought from a molfar to assist with housework and drive away other demons. Such a servant is known as a "Khovanets" (hidden one), and has many similarities to a Domovyk. It is easily offended, and often causes minor damage out of anger.

The most common and effective wards against Chorts are considered to be prayer and a cross. Other stories involve braiding Wolfsbane (aconite) and rue into young women's hair to ward away "unclean", false suitors.

Ukrainian beliefs related to Chorts were meaningfully illustrated by leading Ukrainian ethnographers Pavlo Chubynsky, Vasyl Myloradovych, Georgy Bulashev, Volodymyr Shukhevych, Volodymyr Hnatiuk, and others. Additional studies of this character were made by the famous Russian ethnolinguists Nikita Tolstoy and Lyudmila Vinogradova.

== In Russian culture ==
In Russian folk mythology, the figure of the chort combines within itself characteristics of a variety of typologically different demonic beings. In various Russian folk beliefs, the chort, the bies, the devil, and Satan were regarded as one and the same figure - although statements separating the beings have, on occasion, been recorded as well.

Beliefs about the origin and appearance of this figure differ little across the East Slavic region, since the chort was, to a considerable extent, shaped on the basis of widespread regional religious and iconographic representations. As such, the chort was depicted as an anthropomorphic figure with horns, hooves, and a tail.

Beliefs about the chort's characteristics and functions can be reconstructed from motifs found in Russian bylichkas. According to these beliefs, chorts take possession of the souls of deceased sinners; drive people who play with a rope towards suicide, after which the victim's soul serves the chort as a riding horse; and participate as divinatory spirits in young people's fortune-telling rituals. Chorts are believed to be immune to ordinary bullets, and can only be defeated using a copper button.

In some areas of Russia, the chort is depicted as a relatively benevolent figure, who was associated with playing harmless tricks on people, and was even credited with the ability to repay favors with kindness. In one such tale, a peasant saves a chort from being struck by lightning during a storm, and the chort agrees to go into military service in his place.

Some beliefs, particularly widespread and well documented in the Russian North among the Old Believers of the Pomor priestless tradition, include a category of minor chort or demon called ikota — an unclean spirit sent by a sorcerer that enters a person's body and harms their health, causes neurotic episodes, and moves independently within the body. It imposes its own preferences regarding food and drink on its victim, and prevents them from making the sign of the cross. The sorcerer or sorceress may be referred to as ikotnik or ikotnitsa, and the victim is referred to as either ikotnitsa or klikusha.

Due to their association with unclean forces, possessed people were often regarded as clairvoyants capable of predicting the future. Fellow villagers would visit them to learn about missing belongings and livestock, the fate of absent family members, and their own future.

== See also ==
- Bies
- Chernobog and Belobog
- Krampus
- Companions of Saint Nicholas

== Bibliography ==
1. Афанасьев А. Н. «Поэтические воззрения славян на природу». — М.: 1865−1869. — Том 3, глава 22 (in Russian)
