= Archura =

Turkic shapeshifting woodland spirit

Archura (Old Turkic: 𐰀𐰺𐰲𐰆𐰺𐰀; Turkish: Arçura) is a shapeshifting woodland spirit in Turkic mythology who protects wild animals and forests.

== Description ==
Archura usually appears as a man, but he is able to change his size from that of a blade of grass to a very tall tree. He has hair and a beard made from living grass, and is sometimes depicted with a tail, hooves, and horns. Archura has a close bond with the gray wolf. Legend describes him as having a red scarf and his left shoe on his right foot. He also had no shadow.

Archura protects the animals and birds in the forest and tells them when to migrate. He can shapeshift into many different forms. As a human, he looks like a peasant with glowing eyes.

Archuras are terribly mischievous beings: they have horrible cries, and can imitate voices of people familiar to wanderers and lure them back to their caves, where the Archuras will tickle them to death; they also remove signs from their posts. They aren't evil: although they enjoy misguiding humans and kidnapping young women, they are also known to keep grazing cattle from wandering too far into the forests and getting lost. Sometimes more than one Archura inhabits a forest, and then they will fight for their territory, knocking down trees and scaring animals.

== Chor / Chura ==
There are two different kinds of Chura. The other is Bichura, a household spirit and consort of Ev iyesi.

== See also ==
- Shurala
- Äbädä

== Bibliography ==
- (in Russian) Мифологический словарь/Гл. ред. Мелетинский Е.М. - М.: Советская энциклопедия, 1990 г.- 672 с.
- (in Russian) Мифы народов мира/под ред. Токарева С. А. - М., Советская энциклопедия, 1992 г. - т.2 - 719 с.
