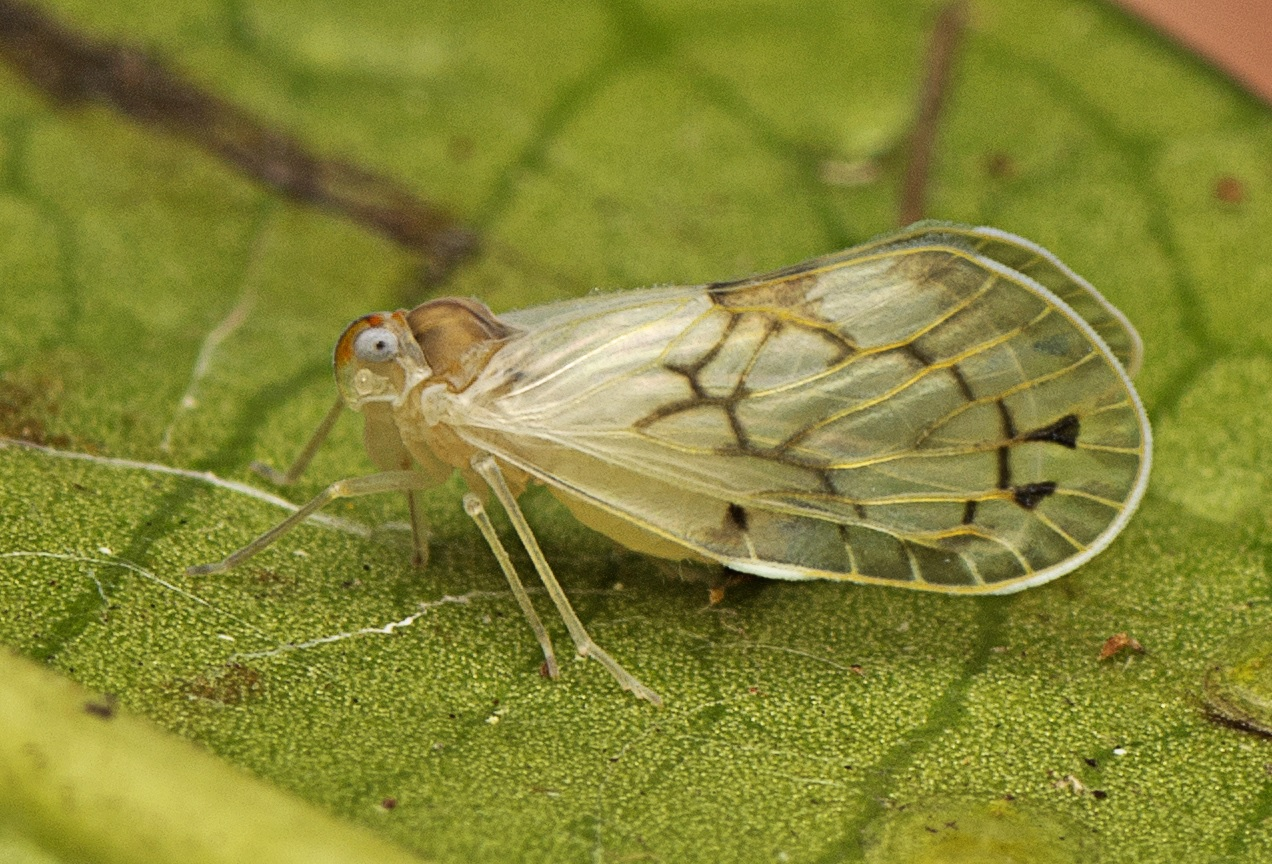
- Levu vitiensis

Scientific classification
- Kingdom: Animalia
- Phylum: Arthropoda
- Clade: Pancrustacea
- Class: Insecta
- Order: Hemiptera
- Suborder: Auchenorrhyncha
- Infraorder: Fulgoromorpha
- Family: Derbidae
- Subfamily: Otiocerinae
- Tribe: Rhotanini
- Genus: Levu; Kirkaldy 1906

= Levu =

Genus of planthoppers

Levu is a genus of small planthoppers from the family Derbidae, tribe Rhotanini, with more than 30 species. The species are found mainly on the islands of the western Pacific, particularly Melanesia. A few species have been also reported from eastern Australia and mainland Asia. The adult hoppers are around 4–5 mm long from head to the tip of the forewings. They lack the bright colours or conspicuous wing patters of other derbids, but a few species have red or orange markings. The wings may be carried in a roof-like (tectiform) position when the insects are at rest or they form a common plane like in house flies.

Type species: Levu vitiensis Kirkaldy, 1906

== Distribution ==
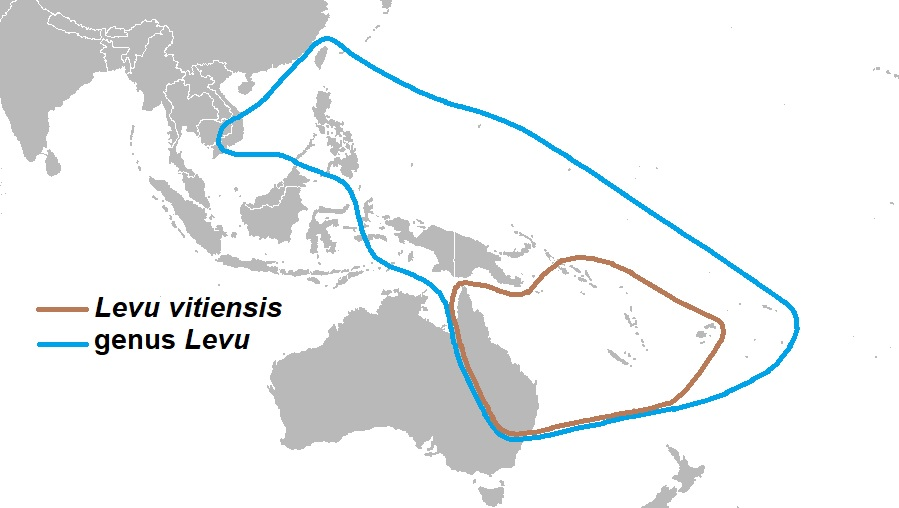
Distribution ranges of the species in the genus Levu (blue outline) and that of the type species, Levu vitiensis (brown outline)

Most of the species of Levu have been reported from the islands of the western Pacific, especially from Melanesia, including New Guinea (7 species), the Solomon Islands (7 species), Vanuatu (4 species), Fiji (2 species) and New Caledonia (1 species). Levu species are also found in Polynesia (3 species), Micronesia (5 species) and the Philippines (6 species). Further, one or two species each have been recorded in Australia, Indonesia, Taiwan and mainland Asia. The type species Levu vitiensis has an unusually wide distribution compared to other species of Levu, ranging from Fiji in the East to Australia in the West, as far south as New South Wales, and including parts of the Solomon Islands, Vanuatu and New Caledonia.

== Description ==
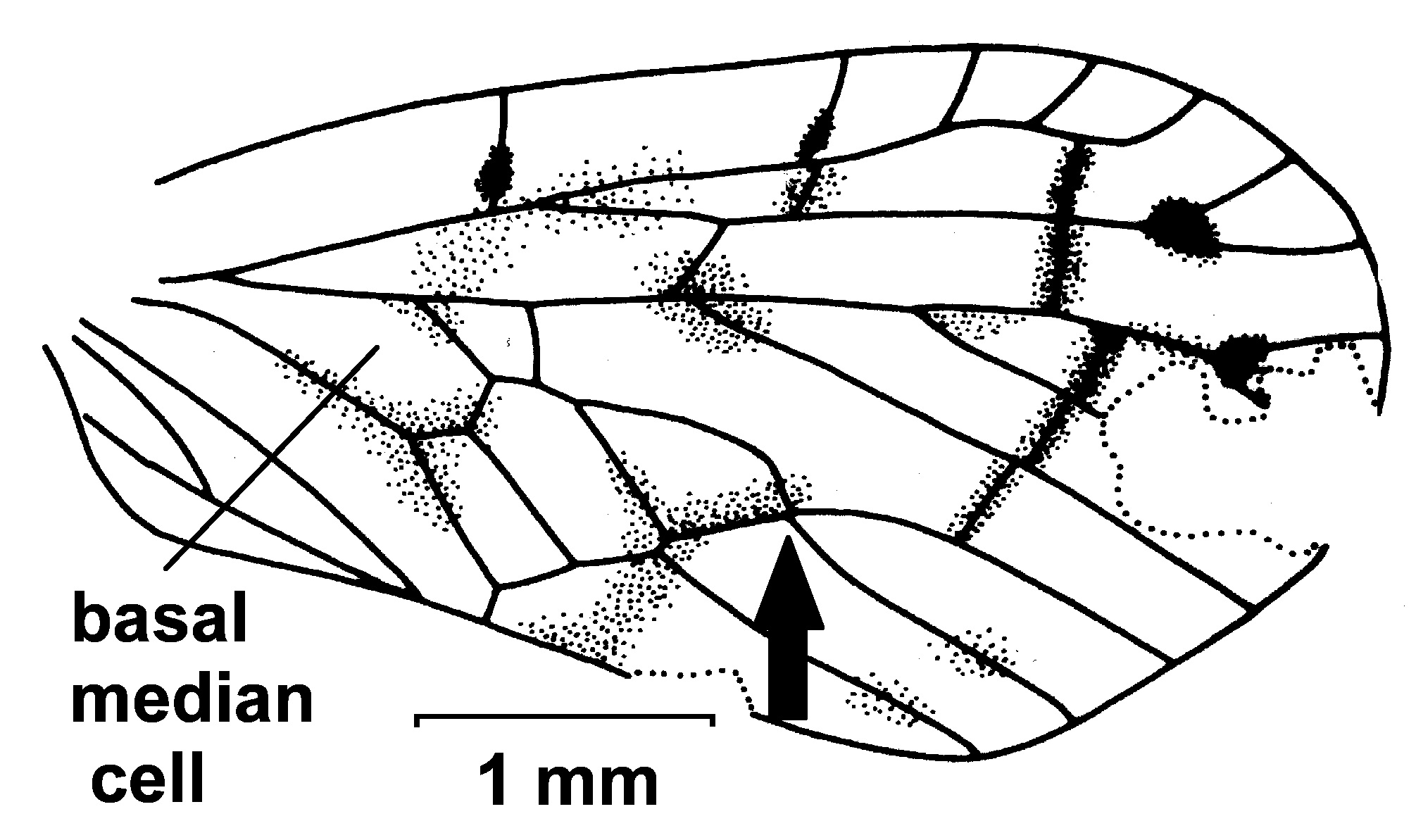
Forewing venation of Levu samoensis

The species of Levu have a similar forewing venation compared to the sister genus Rhotana. In general however, the forewings are narrower, especially the basal median cell. The species are smaller than those of Rhotana, although the smallest species of Rhotana are of similar size compared to the largest species of Levu. The forewings of Levu are less transparent and are often lightly powdered. The forewings have few conspicuous markings and lack the colour pattern often found in Rhotana, but some species have dark brown forewings (L. rufulus, L. nocturnus). The hind wings always lack any markings. When the insects are at rest, the wings may be carried in a roof-like (tectiform) position (see the taxobox above) or form a common plane like in house flies. While most Levu species have a uniformly straw-coloured body, some species have red or orange marks on the head, for example around the eyes or along the face (frons) like in Levu knighti. The forewings venation of Levu samoensis is unusual in that the 2 sub-branches of the basal branch of the media curve towards each other and touch each other briefly around half way before reaching the wing margin (arrow in illustration at left). This venation is found in 7 species which have been grouped into the "Levu samoensis species group".

== Biology ==
There is almost no information on the biology of the species of Levu. It is assumed that the nymphal stages live in decaying organic matter like other derbids, feeding on fungi. There is also little information on the host plants the adults feed on. Some species have been collected from palms like many other derbids (e.g. Levu apiatus), others seem to be polyphagous like Levu vitiensis which has been reported on palms (Araceae), but also on Pipturus, Flagellaria and Acalypha plants.

== Taxonomy and species ==
The genus Levu and the type species Levu vitiensis have been named after the Fijian island Viti Levu, the locality of the type. Actually, in Fijian, "levu" means big (Viti Levu = big land), a grand name for a group of tiny insects. A total of 34 species of Levu have been described (as of 2026), most of them restricted to a few islands. The most frequently collected species include:

- Levu apiatus (New Guinea)
- Levu erraticus (New Guinea, Vanuatu)
- Levu knighti (Solomon Islands)
- Levu rubropleuralis (Philippines)
- Levu samoensis (Samoa)
- Levu vitiensis (many parts of Melanesia and eastern Australia)

For all species see the complete, alphabetical list of species.

=== Levu vitiensis Kirkaldy, 1906 ===
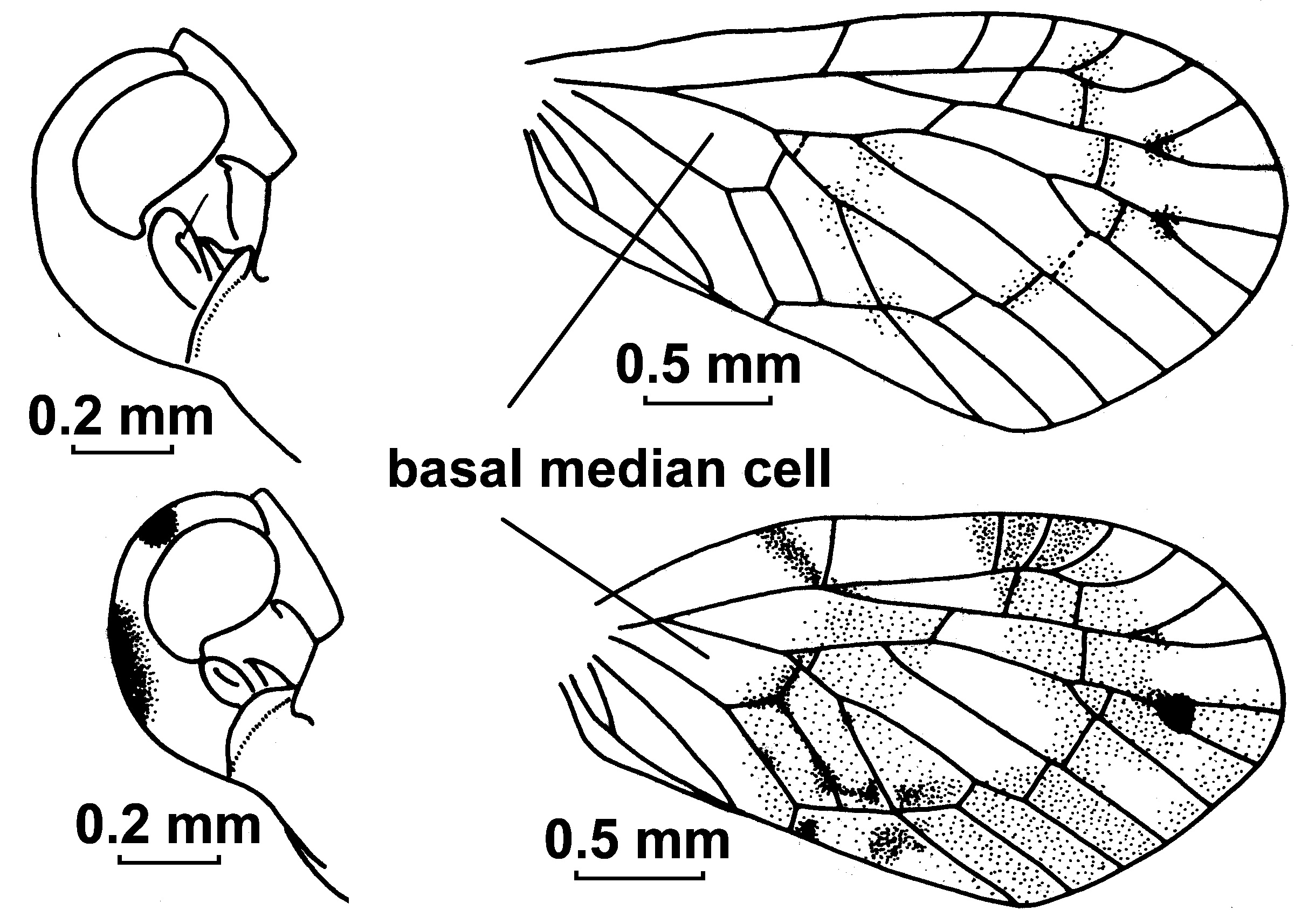
Patterns on head and forewing of Levu vitiensis, of specimens from Fiji, Vanuatu and the Solomon Islands

The type species Levu vitiensis is unusual, not only because of its wide distribution range but also because of its variation in colour patterns. As illustrated on the left, the markings on the head can vary from none to one or two orange, orange-brown or red marks in front of the eyes. The background colour of the head and mesonotum can vary from straw-coloured to distinctly brown. While there are always 2 dark brown or black marks near the forewing tip, the remaining colouration of the forewing can vary considerably, from nearly white veins and a little light brown around some of them, to most veins being brownish or orange brown and accompanied by brown areas. There is a continuous range among these colour forms, even on the same island and an absence of other characters which could separate these forms.
