= List of Levu species =

Genus of planthoppers

The following species in the insect genus Levu (family Derbidae, tribe Rhotanini) are recognized as of 2026. Basionyms are given in square brackets.

- Levu amboinensis Muir 1913 (Ambon Isl., Indonesia, rare)
- Levu apiatus Zelazny 2011 (New Guinea, moderately common)
- Levu apicalis Zelazny 2011 (Laos, rare)
- Levu bicolensis Zelazny, 1981 (Albay Prov., Philippines, rare)
- Levu candidus Zelazny 2011 (Papua New Guinea, uncommon)
- Levu confinis Zelazny 2011 (Vietnam, rare)
- Levu echinus Zelazny 2011 (New Guinea Island, uncommon)
- Levu elmohardyi Zelazny 2011 (New Guinea, uncommon)
- Levu elongatus Zelazny 1981 (Mindanao Isl. and Basilan Isl., Philippines, uncommon)
- Levu erraticus Zelazny 2011 (New Guinea, New Ireland, Vanuatu, moderately common)
- Levu haedulus Fennah 1956 [Levu pallescens haedulus] (Truk Islands, Micronesia, uncommon)
- Levu halosydne (Kirkaldy 1907) [Rhotana halosydne] (Fiji Islands, rare)
- Levu immaculatus Zelazny, 2011 (Vanuatu Islands, uncommon)
- Levu kirkaldyi Zelazny 2011 (Solomon Islands, uncommon)
- Levu knighti Zelazny 2011 (Solomon Islands, uncommon)
- Levu kraussi Zelazny 2011 (Tonga Islands, rare)
- Levu lactineus Fennah 1956 [Levu pallescens lactinea] (Palau Islands, moderately common)
- Levu muiri Zelazny 1981 (Laguna Prov., Philippines, uncommon)
- Levu nocturnus Zelazny 2011 (Vanuatu Islands, uncommon)
- Levu paganus Fennah 1956 [Levu pallescens pagana] (Ponape Islands, moderately common)
- Levu pallescens (Metcalf 1946) [Muiralyricen pallescens] (Guam and Yap Islands, uncommon)
- Levu patolai Zelazny 1981 (Luzon Isl., Philippines, uncommon)
- Levu penarius Yang & Wu 1993 [Levu penaria] (Taiwan, uncommon)
- Levu psittacus Zelazny 2011 (Solomon Islands, uncommon)
- Levu pudens Zelazny 2011 (Solomon Islands, uncommon)
- Levu rubrofrontalis Zelazny 1981 (Luzon Isl., Philippines, uncommon)
- Levu rubropleuralis Zelazny 1981 (Philippines, moderately common)
- Levu rufigena Zelazny 2011 (Solomon Islands, rare)
- Levu rufulus Muir 1927 (Samoan Islands, Guam, uncommon)
- Levu samoensis Muir 1927 (Samoan Islands, moderately common)
- Levu shanahani Zelazny 2011 (Solomon Islands, uncommon)
- Levu simplissimus Zelazny 2011 (New Guinea, rare)
- Levu triangularis Zelazny 2011 (New Guinea and New Ireland, uncommon)
- Levu vitiensis Kirkaldy 1906 (Fiji, south-western Pacific islands and eastern Australia, moderately common, common in some areas)
