= Rachel Leah Jones =

American-Israeli documentary filmmaker

Rachel Leah Jones (Hebrew: רחל לאה ג'ונס; born 1970) is an American-Israeli documentary film director and producer. Her documentary film Advocate about the human rights lawyer Lea Tsemel, which she co-directed and co-produced with cinematographer Philippe Bellaïche, premiered at the 2019 Sundance Film Festival, garnered top prizes at Kraków Film Festival, Thessaloniki Documentary Festival, Docaviv Festival, and won an Emmy Award for Best Documentary.

== Early life and education ==
Jones was born in Berkeley, California and raised in Tel Aviv. She has a Bachelor of Arts in Race, Class, & Gender Studies and Film, Photography and the Politics of Representation from Evergreen State College in Olympia, Washington, and a Master of Fine Arts in Documentary Media Arts from the City College of New York in 2000. Over the years, Jones has worked extensively on socially and politically engaged documentaries in and about Israel/Palestine and has been affiliated with progressive media outlets such as the joint Israeli-Palestinian non-governmental organization the Alternative Information Center in Jerusalem and the critically acclaimed public television and radio program Democracy Now! in New York City.

== Career ==
From 1992 until 1998, Jones worked in several positions in the non-profit sector, including as a fundraiser, writer and photo editor at the Alternative Information Center, an NGO that disseminated critical information and progressive analysis on Israeli society, Palestinian society, and the Israeli-Palestinian conflict; as a fundraiser for HILA, a Mizrahi-Arab-Ethiopian NGO that advocated for disempowered children and parents in the public education system; and as the political projects coordinator for the Jerusalem Link, a joint Israeli-Palestinian women's NGO working to empower women in both societies.

=== Documentary films ===
In 1994, Jones began her career in documentary filmmaking, working as a line producer and assistant director, working primarily on films by Duki Dror, among them the award-winning Raging Dove; and films by Simone Bitton, including the film Wall, which premiered in the Director's Fortnight at the 2004 Cannes Film Festival and won the Special Jury Award at the 2005 Sundance Film Festival, among other international prizes.

The first documentary directed and co-produced by Jones was 500 Dunam on the Moon in 2002, which tells the story of Ayn Hawd, a Palestinian village that was captured and depopulated by Israeli forces in the 1948 Arab–Israeli War, and subsequently transformed into a Jewish artist colony and renamed Ein Hod. The film was screened at international film festivals, including the San Francisco Jewish Film Festival, Human Rights Watch Film Festival and the Austin Film Festival. It won the Jury Award for Best Documentary at the Festival de Trois Continents, and was broadcast on France 2 television.

In 2007, Jones released her second film, Ashkenaz. The film deals with the social construct of "Ashkenaziness" as the Israeli version of whiteness, public perceptions about Ashkenzi-Mizrahi-Palestinian relations and social status in Israel, highlighting the manner in which the hegemonic group's identity becomes "invisibilized" as "normal" rather than an ethnicity. The film received positive reviews, was screened at documentary, Jewish, and Palestinian film festivals around the world, was released to cinematheques across Israel, and was broadcast on Israel's Channel 8. The controversial subject of the film led to special screenings with discussion panels, in which major cultural figures participated, especially from the non-Ashkenzi side of the social map, such as Sami Shalom Chetrit and Jamal Zahalka, who were also featured in the film. The film was also cited in academic research, such as the journal Pe'amim, published by the Ben Zvi Institute for the study of Jewish communities in the East, in an article by Reuven Snir, "Baghdad Yesterday: About History, Identity and Poetry" (in Hebrew: בגדאד, אתמול: על היסטוריה, זהות ושירה).

Jones' next major effort was of more autobiographical significance. In Gypsy Davy, which premiered at the Sundance Film Festival in 2011, she tells the story of how "A white-boy with Alabama roots becomes a Flamenco guitarist in Andalusian boots and fathers five children to five different women along the way." Jones is one of those children. In the film, she narrates as if she is writing a letter to her elusive father, and gathers his many wives and children to also state their feelings and perceptions of the artist. The film, which was well-received by critics, went on to screen at many international festivals, and won the Jury Award for Best Documentary at the International Women's Film Festival In Rehovot. It was later broadcast on Israel's Channel 8 and on HBO Latin America.

Advocate, which had its world premiere at the Sundance Film Festival on January 27, 2019, and its Israeli premiere at Docaviv on May 23, 2019, proved to be her most controversial work to date. The film, co-directed and co-produced with Philippe Bellaïche, tells the story of Lea Tsemel, an Israeli human rights lawyer known for representing Palestinian defendants, especially those who have engaged in armed actions. When the film won Best Documentary at Docaviv, which was supported by the Israel Lottery Council for Culture and Arts, a storm of right-wing political pressure broke out, demanding that the council renege on its financial obligation to the festival. When Minister of Culture Miri Regev joined the call to cancel its support, calling the film "anti-Israel", the council announced it would no longer fund the award. In response, dozens of leading artists, writers, filmmakers, journalists and professional associations slammed the decision as a curbing of free speech, mounted protests, called for boycotts, and published columns and editorials protesting the governmental interference in cultural production.

The film, which was enthusiastically received by critics, opened the 2019 Human Rights Watch Film Festival, and plucked top prizes at the Kraków Film Festival, Hong Kong International Film Festival, and the Thessaloniki Documentary festival, among others. Advocate's Israeli theatrical premiere took place on September 5, 2019, when it opened at cinematheques across the country and subsequently in the united States, where it was distributed by Film Movement. Similarly, it was sold to dozens of territories and aired on PBS' POV, BBC Storyville, DR, SVT, YLE, FRANCE TELEVISONS, among others.

Due to the public reaction to the film, Jones, who was already a well-known and highly regarded filmmaker in Israel and abroad, quickly became the center of the high-profile media coverage of Advocate, at home and internationally. The film has been called both a symbol and a standard bearer by critics.

In 2025, Jones wrote and produced Coexistence, My Ass! directed and produced by Amber Fares, revolving around Noam Shuster Eliassi as she crafts a one-woman show by the same name. The film had its world premiere at the 2025 Sundance Film Festival on January 26 and went on to win the Jury Award for Freedom odf Speech, as well as the Golden Alexander and the Council of Europe Human Rights in Motion Award (2025) at the Thessaloniki International Documentary Festival, the Full Frame Documentary Film Festival, CDS Filmmaker Award (2025), and the Torino Film Festival, Special Jury Prize (2025), among others. A New York Times Critic's Pick (2025), the film won the International Documentary Film Festival Amsterdam Forum Award for Best Rough Cut (2023), while still in production. Like Advocate six years prior, Coexistence, My Ass! was also shortlisted for the Oscars.

=== Television ===
From 2001 to 2002, Jones was an editor and camerawoman for the nationally syndicated US television program, Democracy Now!, hosted by Amy Goodman, working during that time on the transition of the program from radio to television. From 2003 to 2004, she produced several documentary programs, including two episodes of the French television series L'Invitation au Voyage, about Palestinian poet Mahmoud Darwish and Israeli novelist Aharon Applefeld, hosted by Laure Adler and "Another Israel", a reporting segment for the France 2 program Un Oeil sur le Palenete.

=== Publishing ===
Jones has worked as a translator and editor in the publishing industry, mostly between 2001 and 2006. Among the books she translated are: Self Portrait: Palestinian Women's Art (Lerer, Yael Ed.; 2001, Andalus, Tel Aviv); Breaking Ranks: Refusing to Serve in the West Bank and Gaza Strip (Chacham, Ronit, Ed.; 2002, Other Press, New York); Reporting From Ramallah: An Israeli Journalist (Amira Hass) In An Occupied Land (also edited by Jones; 2003, Semiotext(e), New York); Mother Tongue: A Mizrahi Present That Stirs In The Thickets Of An Arab Past (Nizri, Yigal Ed.; 2005, Babel, Tel Aviv); Cities of Collision: Jerusalem and the Principle of Conflict Urbanism (Misselwitz, Philippe & Rienitis, Tim, Eds.; 2006, Birkhauser Press Basel-Boston-Berlin).

== Filmography ==
=== Film ===
Year	Film	Role	Notes
2025	Coexistence, My Ass!	Writer, producer	Documentary
2019	Advocate	Director, producer	Documentary
2018	Podium	Director, producer	Documentary (pre-release)
2017	The Red House	Editor	Documentary short
2016	Sally Valley	Director, producer	Documentary
2015	Take 3	Editor	Documentary short
2011	Gypsy Davy	Director, producer, editor	Documentary
2010	Targeted Citizen	Director, editor	Documentary short
2007	Ashkenaz	Director, writer	Documentary
2002	500 Dunam on the Moon	Director, producer	Documentary

=== Television ===
Year	Program	Role	Notes
2005	L’Invitation au Voyage	Producer	France 5 documentary series; episodes 5 and 6
2004	Capte/Absolut: Ism	Director, Camera	Arte culture magazine segment
2004	Un Oeil sur la Palenete	Producer	France 2; segment, "Another Israel"
2001–2002	Democracy Now!	Camera, Editor	

== Awards ==
Year	Award	Category	Work	Result
2002	Festival de Trois Continents	Jury Award for Best Documentary	500 Dunam on the Moon	Won
2011	Cinema South Film Festival	Juliano Mer Khamis Documentary Award	Gypsy Davy	Won
2011	Documentary Edge Film Festival	Best Culture Vultures	Gypsy Davy	Won
2012	Doc NYC	Viewfinders Grand Jury Prize	Gypsy Davy	Nominated
2012	Sundance Film Festival	Jury Award: World Cinema - Documentary	Gypsy Davy	Nominated
2012	International Women's Film Festival In Rehovot	Best Documentary	Gypsy Davy	Won
2019	Sundance Film Festival	Jury Award: World Cinema - Documentary	Advocate	Nominated
2019	Copenhagen International Documentary Film Festival	Politiken's Audience Award	Advocate	Nominated
2019	DocAviv Film Festival	Best Israeli Film	Advocate	Won
2019	Dokufest	Human Rights Dox	Advocate	Nominated
2019	Hong Kong International Film Festival	Jury Prize: Best Documentary	Advocate	Won
2019	Hong Kong International Film Festival	Golden Firebird Award	Advocate	Nominated
2019	Kraków Film Festival	Golden Horn: Best Feature-Length Documentary	Advocate	Won
2019	Thessaloniki Documentary Festival	Golden Alexander	Advocate	Won
2019	Thessaloniki Documentary Festival	FIPRESCI Prize	Advocate	Won
2019	Transatlantyk Festival: Lodz	Kaleidoscope	Advocate	Nominated

Note that all awards and nominations for Advocate are shared by Philippe Bellaiche.
