= 500 Dunam on the Moon =

2002 documentary film

- Directed by: Rachel Leah Jones
- Written by: Rachel Leah Jones
- Produced by: Rachel Leah Jones; Eyal Sivan, Omar al-Qattan
- Cinematography: Philippe Bellaiche
- Edited by: Rachel Leah Jones, Ruben Kornfeld
- Music by: Anouar Brahem
- Production companies: Momento!, RLJ Productions
- Distributed by: Arab Film Distribution
- Release date: 2002
- Running time: 48 minutes
- Countries: France, United States
- Languages: Arabic, Hebrew

500 Dunam on the Moon is a 2002 documentary film directed by Rachel Leah Jones about Ein Hod, a Palestinian village that was captured and depopulated by Israeli forces as part of the 1948 Palestinian expulsion and flight in the 1948 Arab–Israeli War.

== Synopsis ==
The 700 year-old Palestinian village of Ayn Hawd was captured by Israeli forces in the 1948 war. The village was depopulated, most of its residents sent to refugee camps in Jordan and the West Bank. In 1953, Marcel Janco, a Romanian painter and a founder of the Dada movement, decided to "preserve" the village, transforming it into a Jewish artists' colony, turning the mosque into a cafe/bar, and renaming it Ein Hod.

500 Dunam on the Moon tells the story of the village founded by Abu Hilmi, one of the original inhabitants, who, after the expulsion, created a "new Ayn Hawd" on what used to be his pastureland in the hills, only 1.5 kilometers away. This new Ayn Hawd is not on any map, and is not recognized by Israeli law. Viewed by the authorities as "present absentees", the residents of Ayn Hawd do not receive basic services such as water, electricity or an access road. The film critically examines the art of dispossession and the creativity of the dispossessed.

== Production ==
The film was produced by RLJ Productions (USA) and Momento! (France).

== Release ==
Selected festival screenings:

- Human Rights Watch International Film Festival, New York 2002
- Human Right Watch Travelling film festival, New York 2002
- San Francisco Jewish Film Festival, San Francisco 2002
- Cinema South, Sappir College, 2002
- Fotofest Houston, Houston 2002
- CinemaTexas, Austin 2002
- Reel Jews Documentary Film Festival, New York 2002
- Arab Film Festival, San Francisco 2002
- Pictures of Palestine, Maine 2002
- Tiburon Int. Film Festival, Tiburn 2003
- PalArt Festival, Ecosse 2003
- Palestine/Israel : What can Cinema Do ?, Paris-Bruxelles 2003
- DocFest Monthly, New York 2003

== Reception ==
Educational Media Reviews recommends 500 Dunam on the Moon, and writes: "Rachel Leah Jones does an incredible job of bringing to the screen the story of the “new Ayn Hawd” refugees. Interviews with the villagers relate the almost unbearable circumstances under which they live. The film demonstrates the drive of the displaced people to make the most of the little they have. The struggle for recognition, electricity, water and a road is presented through the eyes of one man and his determination to change things."

In the Journal of Palestine Studies, Sherene Seikaly writes: "A series of shots treats the viewer to Janco’s sumptuous grande fetes, complete with colorful paintings ironically juxtaposed to the backdrop of Anouer Brahem’s sad Arabesques. These journeys to carefree celebrations and artistic glory are coupled with the wrecking ball destroying Palestinian homes. It is in this marriage and in Ein Hod that the Dadaist return to a 'primitive,' indigenous art found one of its most paradoxical articulations. The very 'naturalness' of Ein Hod was only possible through the uprooting of olive trees and their replacement with what Abu al-Hayja calls the 'Jewish cypress.'"

The film was scheduled to be screened at the Ecosphera art festival at Ein Hod in 2002, and was cancelled at the last minute by the festival's organizers. Jones was notified by phone that 500 Dunam on the Moon "just doesn't sit well". However, in 2017, the film was screened in the village at the Dada Yanko art museum, during the exhibition "From the village of you come and to the village you shall return", which displayed art on the subject of displacement by both Israeli and Palestinian artists. 500 Dunam on the Moon was also the subject of heated debate within the architectural community in Israel, with one side claiming the film fails to recognize the "complexity" of the issue, and the other pointing out that other than using the word "complex", no other arguments had been put forth.

== Awards ==
Year	Award	Category	Result
2002	Three Continents Festival	Jury Award for Best Documentary	Won

== See also ==
- Omar al-Qattan
- Advocate
- Ashkenaz
- Gypsy Davy
