= Gypsy Davy (film) =

2011 documentary film

- Produced by: Rachel Leah Jones; Philippe Bellaiche
- Starring: David Serva Jones
- Narrated by: Rachel Leah Jones
- Cinematography: Philippe Bellaiche; Rachel Leah Jones
- Release dates: 10 July 2011 (Jerusalem Film Festival); 24 January 2012 (Sundance Film Festival)
- Running time: 96 minutes
- Country: Israel

Gypsy Davy is a 2011 documentary film, directed by Rachel Leah Jones, and co-produced by Jones and Philippe Ballaiche.

== Synopsis ==
The film is narrated by the director, Rachel Leah Jones, as a letter to her father. Her father is "David Serva," who was born David Jones, in Berkeley, California. Described as a "white-boy with Alabama roots", he went on to become a well known flamenco guitarist- the first American to have a successful career in flamenco in Spain. Jones' mother, Judith Jones, was a "Brooklyn-born Jewish girl" who became a flamenco dancer. The two started a family in Berkeley, California, in the early 1970s.

Serva quickly abandoned his wife and baby daughter, and during his life and career, he amassed a total of five wives, and had children with each of them. Through her own memories and those of his other children and wives, in Gypsy Davy Jones creates a personal and political portrait of a man, and examines the legacy of an artist and his family.

== Production ==
Gypsy Davy was in the making for about a decade. Over this time, producer-director Rachel Leah Jones filmed her father, who had left her in infancy. She also interviewed her own mother, and her half-siblings and their mothers, combining these interviews with archival footage and her own narration.

The film was created with support of the Israeli New Fund for Cinema and Television.

== Release ==
The US premiere of the Gypsy Davy was at the 2012 Sundance Film Festival. The film had previously screened in Israel in 2011 at the Jerusalem Film Festival.

=== Select festival screenings ===
- Jerusalem International Film Festival, Israel, 2011
- Sundance Film Festival, USA, 2012
- True/False Film Festival, USA, 2012
- Visions du Reel Documentary Film Festival, Switzerland, 2012
- San Francisco Jewish Film Festival, Israel, 2012
- DMZ Docs, South Korea, 2012
- Taiwan International Documentary Film Festival, 2012
- Seville European Film Festival, Spain, 2012
- International Women's Film Festival in Rehovot, Israel, 2012
- DocNYC, USA, 2012
- Olympia Film Festival, USA, 2012
- Buenos Aires International Festival of Independent Cinema (BAFICI), Argentina, 2013
- Portland Jewish Film Festival, USA, 2013

== Reception ==
In his mostly-positive review, Screen Daily reviewer Tim Grierson writes that in spite of the main premise of a famous musician's infidelity being unsurprising, "director Rachel Leah Jones’s Gypsy Davy takes that truism and wrings something thought-provoking and melancholy from it." Though Grierson dislikes the narration, he praises the film's music and finds the family-member interviews to be the strongest point of the film. In his Variety review, Dennis Harvey calls the film "as engrossing as a flavorsome, twisty literary novel", lauding both the "colorful characters" and the music. Calling Gypsy Davy "an interesting story and great personal work", Jonas Weir, in Vox Magazine, sums the work up as "a portrait of a man who led an irresponsible life that hurt a lot of people and his daughter’s coming to terms with who he is. David Jones doesn’t seem like a completely rotten man, just a man who has done some completely rotten things."

John DeFore, on the other hand, in the Hollywood Reporter, calls the film a "self-obsessed personal voyage" that is uninteresting to anyone not involved in the story.

== Awards ==
Year	Award	Category	Result
2011	Cinema South Film Festival	Juliano Mer Khamis Documentary Award	Won
2011	Documentary Edge Film Festival	Best Culture Vultures	Won
2012	Doc NYC	Viewfinders Grand Jury Prize	Nominated
2012	Sundance Film Festival	Jury Award: World Cinema - Documentary	Nominated
2012	International Women's Film Festival In Rehovot	Best Documentary	Won

== See also ==
- Advocate
- Ashkenaz
- 500 Dunam on the Moon
