= Ashkenaz (film) =

2007 documentary film

- Directed by: Rachel Leah Jones
- Produced by: Osnat Trabelsi
- Cinematography: Philippe Bellaiche
- Edited by: Eyal Sivan, Morris Ben Mayor
- Music by: Habiluim, Oy Division
- Production company: Trabelsi Productions
- Release date: 6 December 2007
- Running time: 72 minutes
- Country: Israel
- Languages: Hebrew, English, Yiddish

Ashkenaz is a 2007 Israeli documentary film, directed by Rachel Leah Jones.

== Synopsis ==
Ashkenazim – Jews of European origin – are Israel's "white folks." Like most white people in multicultural societies, Ashkenazim do not think of themselves in racial or ethnic terms, but rather as "just people", whereas people from any other cultural group are "ethnic" and "minorities". However, in the Israeli context, sometimes even the minority status of oppressed or disadvantaged groups is denied, because (as was frequently said by interviewees in the film) by now, "aren't we all just Israeli?" Yiddish has been replaced with Hebrew, exile with occupation, the shtetl with the kibbutz. But the paradox of whiteness in Israel is that Ashkenazim aren't exactly "white folks" historically.

By reviewing both Ashkenazi history and attitudes held by Israelis of Ashkenazi extraction, the film interrogates racial politics in Israel, and seeks to expose and raise to consciousness the existence of Ashkenazi identity, which is largely invisible-ized in a country where they are the hegemonic, power-holding group. Ashkenaz looks at whiteness in Israel and asks: How did the "others" of Europe become the "Europe" of the others?

== Production ==
Ashkenaz was produced by Osnat Trabelsi's production company, Trabelsi Productions, with funding from The Rabinovich Foundation for the Arts – Cinema Project.

Jones, who was born in Berkeley, California, but grew up in Israel, was always hyper-aware of her "Ashkenazi-ness", and wrote about the subject during her studies in Race, Gender and Politics at Hebrew University. When she became a filmmaker, she decided to translate her written essay into a film essay, with the goal of bringing "the discussion of whiteness into the discussion of Israeliness".

When producer Osnat Trabelsi approached the New Israel Fund for backing, she requested that the film be included in its minority track program. The request met with confusion and even antagonism, which Trabelsi had anticipated and perhaps wanted to trigger, to prove the point of the film, that Ashkenazim do not believe themselves to have an ethnicity, they are just "regular" – and accordingly, there is no such thing as "Ashkenazi cinema", although the funders, recipients, and filmmakers in Israel are overwhelmingly of Ashkenazi origin. The film was made without the support of the New Israel Fund, and the incident remained an example used in further activism and as part of her thesis on ethnic relations and power structures in Israel.

== Release ==
In Israel, the film premiered at the Jerusalem Cinematheque on December 6, 2007, and showed at Cinematheques across the country. In North America, the film premiered at the San Francisco Jewish Film Festival on August 10, 2008. It was later broadcast on Israel's Channel 8.

=== Film festivals ===
- Jewish Film Series, Highland Park, 2013
- Boston Palestine Film Festival, USA, October, 2010
- Olympia Film Festival, USA, November 2008
- UK Jewish Film Festival, UK November 2008
- International Documentary Film Festival, Turkey, November 2008
- Krakow Jewish Culture Festival, Poland, July 2008
- San Francisco Jewish Film Festival, USA, July 2008
- Jerusalem Jewish Film Festival, Israel, December 2007

== Reception ==
In the Haaretz review of Ashkenaz, Amos Noy writes, "In a brilliant move, the film does what in retrospect appears to be the only thing it could do with something that defines itself by way of negation: it turns to the negated and asks them to define it as they see it." Noy expounds on the refusal of Ashkenazim to see themselves as an ethnic group, who'd rather view themselves as distinguished from "the other": secular rather than religious, rational rather than emotional, cultures rather than primitive, educated rather than ignorant, not-oriental, not-Arab, and many more "nots". Noy wonders when a category of "Ashkenazi cinema" will be recognized, rather than simply "cinema", make by Ashkenazim, whereas cinema of other cultures is marked: Mizrahi cinema, Palestinian cinema, and so on.

Poriya Gal, in her review of the film in Maariv, points out how often, in the film and independent of it, Ashkenazi people become offended at the use of the word Ashkenazi, as if any association of ethnicity and as a result, of ethnic strife is reserved for people of color: which in the Israeli Jewish context means Mizrahim, and in the wider context, Palestinians. She describes how discussing "Ashenazi-ness" is "not considered an appropriate social conversation topic". She praises the filmmakers' choice to blend exposition by articulate experts with random people encountered on the street: This mix not only maintains a dialogue between the research and its subjects, but also makes it clear that Ashkenazi-ness, as is evident in the film, is not only a research subject but also a living and breathing body, albeit repressed: something that, with all the "irrelevance" that some interviewees claim, still provokes emotion. For example, one of the interviewees broke into a spontaneous recitation of poetry in Yiddish, another eulogized the forgotten language with tears, and there are those who declare that ethnic differences no longer exist, yet evoke images taken directly from the 'database of Ashkenaz'."

== See also ==
- Advocate
- Gypsy Davy
- 500 Dunam on the Moon
