= Osnat Trabelsi =

Israeli film producer

- אסנת טרבלסי
- Born: 21 December 1965 (age 60); Ashdod, Israel
- Education: Tel Aviv University
- Occupation: Film producer
- Years active: Since 1992

Osnat Trabelsi (Hebrew: אסנת טרבלסי; born 21 December 1965) is an Israeli film producer. She is known for producing documentary films on political topics, especially those involving Palestine, the Mizrahi experience in Israel, women's issues, colonialism, racism, and more; and for melding her business with activism, promoting filmmaking in the geographical and social periphery of Israel, and creating access to Palestinian cinema.

== Biography ==
=== Family background ===
Trabelsi was born and grew up in Ashdod, in the south of Israel. Her mother, Rina, immigrated to Israel from Iraq, via Tehran, and lived in a shanty-town allotted to Mizrahi immigrants in Hadera. She later moved to Ramat Gan. Her father, Mordechai, immigrated from Tunis as part of a youth program, and studied in an agricultural school. He later reunited with his family, who came to Israel at a later time, and lived with them in the moshav Beit Hagadi, also in southern Israel. Upon their marriage, Trabelsi's parents moved to Ashdod, where their children were born. Trabelsi is the eldest of four, two boys and two girls.

In 2011, Trabelsi adopted a daughter.

=== Production career ===
When she was 21, Trabelsi pursued film studies at Tel Aviv University. She produced the annual Tel Aviv International Student Film Festival, which has become extremely well-regarded in film circles in Israel over the years. When she graduated, she went on to work as a production coordinator on feature films, the first of which was Eran Riklis' Cup Final (1991). Additional films followed, including Rami Naaman's The Flying Camel (1994) and Riklis' Zohar (1993). On the latter film set, in 1992, she met Juliano Mer-Khamis, and the two embarked on a collaboration to create a film about Mer-Khamis' mother, Arna, who ran a children's theater in Jenin. However, Arna Mer-Khamis died in 1994, and film remained unfinished. Later, in 2002, when news of the fate of some of the then-children who were part of the theater project came to light, the two created the film Arna's Children, produced by Trabelsi and directed by Mer-Khamis, following Arna's political and human rights activism and the stories of the children involved, three of whom died in various circumstances of resistance to the occupying Israeli army. The film won the Best Documentary Award at the Tribeca Film Festival.

After working on several feature films, Trabelsi worked for 10 years as an executive producer for commercials. She produced advertisements for Israeli mega-brands such as Milky, Castro, El Al and Tnuva, while also producing documentary films.

In 1999, she founded Trabelsi Productions, and her first project was a Tnuva campaign in the Palestinian Authority. Until the outbreak of the Second Intifada, her company produced several advertisements for the Palestinian Authority and for Palestinian and international companies. The film Arna's Children was her first international production. The film won many awards in its screenings around the world, and garnered much appreciation. She then produced many other documentaries, most of which deal with political and social issues: the occupation of Palestine, women's struggles with various types of oppression, Ashkenazim and Mizrahim, drugs, and the Holocaust. In 1999, she produced Yigal Burstein's film Smoke Curtain – Three Days with Ariel Zilber; The film documented musician Ariel Zilber, as he recorded his first Arabic-Hebrew CD. In 2002, she produced the film Behind the Fence for the BBC, directed by Inigo Gilmour, which was the first film to be made about Israel's Separation Wall.

In 2007, her film Ashkenaz was released. The film dealt with the way the hegemonic Ashkenazi culture is "unmarked" or invisible in Israel, whereas every other group is "ethnic" and a minority, even though numerically Ashkenazim are not the majority. When she approached the New Israel Fund for backing, she requested that the film be included in its minority track program. The request met with confusion and even antagonism, which Trabelsi had anticipated and perhaps wanted to trigger, to prove the point of the film, that Ashkenazim do not believe themselves to have an ethnicity, they are just "regular" – and accordingly, there is no such thing as "Ashkenazi cinema", although the funders, recipients, and filmmakers in Israel are overwhelmingly of Ashkenazi origin. The film was made without the support of the New Israel Fund, and the incident remained an example used in further activism and as part of her thesis on ethnic relations and power structures in Israel.

In 2010, she produced Erez Miller's debut film, 443, depicting what Miller calls "The Apartheid Road" between Tel Aviv and Jerusalem. In 2013, her film The Sound of Torture gained international acclaim and awards.

=== Activism ===
After many years of trying to "pass" in Ashkenazi culture, Trabelsi began exploring her own identity as a Mizrahi woman after meeting Juliano Mer-Khamis, and being exposed to the Palestinian struggle and experience. She herself grew up in a right-wing, occupation-supporting family, and was only able to return to her roots in this circuitous way. After embarking on her personal journey in this regard, she became especially involved in exploring and drawing a connection between Mizrahi and Palestinian identities and experience in her work and in her activism as well, two areas that she sees as one and the same. When she founded her production company, her stated mission was to create and promote films that are politically engaged with the injustices being perpetrated against Palestinians, as well and other social justice issues.

In February 2000, Trabelsi and Daoud Kuttab initiated and led the international human rights film festival "Basic Trust" in Tel Aviv, Nazareth and Ramallah, with artistic directors Judd Neeman and George Khalife. While planning a second festival, in September 2000, the Second Intifada broke out, and the festival was cancelled. Instead, Trabelsi worked on other major projects that year: The first was to help produce an event called The Empty Land in the Netherlands, based on the Zionist tenet of "A Land without people for a people without a land", providing an international perspective on Palestinian cinema, with film screenings accompanied by discussions. In addition, she produced in cooperation with the Institute for Modern Media a series of five human rights films, directed by Palestinians from the West Bank and Palestinian citizens of Israel. The series was called "Again".

In 2000, she was also involved in an initiative to establish a public body called the "Social Forum for Broadcast Quality", which launched a public campaign against the establishment of another commercial TV channel and advocated for a quality channel based on the British Channel 4 model. The forum included organizations such as the Israeli Documentary Filmmakers Forum and the Mizrahi Democratic Rainbow Coalition and other social organizations, as well as individual activists including Vicki Shiran, Osnat Trabelsi, Yehuda Shenhav, Yossi Yonah, Judd Neeman, Amit Goren, Ephraim Reiner, Avner Ben-Amos and other artists and political activists. The struggle lasted for about a year until an agreement was reached with Ehud Barak's government to create an experimental channel, but in the end, the plans fell through with the beginning of the Second Intifada.

In 2001, together with director Avi Mograbi, she established a five-year project called "The Occupation Club," in which each month a film about Palestine was screened by Palestinian or international directors. These were films that cannot be seen on Israeli television. After each screening, a discussion was held on the film.

During 2001–2004, she served as a member of the board of directors of the Documentary Filmmakers Forum.

In 2003, together with Dr. Moshe Bahar, Tikva Levy and Avital Mozes-Haim, she created the "Films from the Dark Side" project, a series of twelve meetings on various socio-political issues, but from a Mizrahi, anti-establishment and anti-colonial perspective.

In 2006, she organized and held a seminar in Mitzpeh Ramon devoted to the work of Joris Ivens. Since then, Trabelsi has organized an annual pitching workshop for film students in Sderot. In 2008, she co-founded the Department of Film and Media at the Arab College of Mar Elias in the Galilee. She also participating in an exhibition called "Women of Change" in which forty different women are photographed, each writing her own credo.

In 2007, Trabelsi was chosen by The Marker as one of 40 women making a difference in society. She is also a member of the Public Council of Itach-Maaki Women Lawyers for Social Justice.

== Filmography ==
Year	Title	Role	Notes
1991	Cup Final	Production coordinator	Narrative feature
1993	The Benny Zinger Show	Producer	Short
1993	Zohar	Production coordinator	Narrative feature
1994	The Flying Camel	Production coordinator	Narrative feature
1999	Smoke Curtain – Three Days with Ariel Zilber	Producer	Documentary
2001	War Photographer	Line producer: Palestine	Documentary
2002	Behind the Fence	Producer	TV documentary
2004	Arna's Children	Producer	Documentary
2004	Badal	Producer	Documentary
2005	Offside	Producer	Documentary short
2006	(S)Elections	Producer	Video documentary
2006	Gaza: Another Kind of Tears	Producer	Documentary
2006	Strawberry Fields	Producer	Documentary
2006	Bhirot	Producer	Documentary
2007	Sadot Adumim	Producer	Documentary
2007	Gole Sangam	Producer	Video documentary
2007	Ashkenaz	Producer	Documentary
2008	Traffickers	Producer	TV mini-series documentary
2008	GazaSderot	Producer	Web documentary series
2008	Pizza in Auschwitz	Producer	Documentary
2009	Queen Khantarisha	Producer	Documentary
2009	Jaffa, the Orange's Clockwork	Producer	Documentary
2009	Poker Widows	Producer	Documentary
2010	Yellow Mums	Producer	Short
2010	Food of the Earth	Producer	TV documentary series
2010	443	Producer	Documentary
2012	Powder	Producer	Documentary
2013	Sound of Torture	Producer, Executive producer	Documentary
2015	Arab Movie	Producer	Documentary
2015	My Big Fat Cancer Wedding	Producer	Documentary
2016	Dinj	Producer, writer	Documentary
2017	To Be a Dad	Producer	TV mini-series documentary
2018	From Russia With Love	Producer	Documentary

== Awards ==
Award-winning films produced by Trabelsi
Year	Award	Category	Title	Result
2001	Academy award	Best Documentary^{α}	War Photographer	Nominated
2003	IDFA	Best Documentary	Arna's Children	Won
2004	Hot Docs	FIPRESCI award for Best First Documentary Feature	Arna's Children	Won
2004	Tribeca Film Festival	Best Documentary Feature	Arna's Children	Won
2004	Prague One Wold Festival		Arna's Children	Won
2005	Dutch Academy Award		Arna's Children	Won
2006	In the Spirit of Freedom		Strawberry Fields	Won
2006	Bologna International Film Festival	Slow Food on Film	Strawberry Fields	Special mention
2008	Prix Europa	Emerging Media Award	GazaSderot	Won
2008	International Emmy Award for Best Documentary	Best Documentary	GazaSderot	Nominated
2008	Dok Leipzig	Youth Jury Award	Pizza in Auschwitz	Won
2008	IDFA	Best of Fest	Pizza in Auschwitz	Won
2009	Krakow International Film Festival	Golden Dragon	Pizza in Auschwitz	Won
2009	Berdyansk Film Festival	Grand Prix, Full-Length Documentary	Pizza in Auschwitz	Won
2009	International Women's Film Festival In Rehovot	Best Documentary	Queen Khantarisha	Won
2010	Jerusalem Short Film Festival	Best Short	Yellow Mums	Won
2010	South International Film Festival	Best Documentary	443	Won
2012	DocAviv	Best Debut^{β}	Powder	Won
2012	DocAviv	Best Editing^{β}	Powder	Won
2014	DocAviv	Best Debut^{β}	Sound of Torture	Won
2014	Prix Europa	TV Iris	Sound of Torture	Won
2014	Ofir (Israeli Film Academy Award)	Best Documentary	Sound of Torture	Won
2014	International Film Festival and Forum on Human Rights		Sound of Torture	Special mention
2014	Mexico City International Film Festival	Silver Palm	Sound of Torture	Won

== Notes ==
^α Trabelsi was not the nominee, she was the Palestine-side producer.
^β Trabelsi not the recipient
