= Until I Fly =

2024 documentary film by Kanishka Sonthalia and Siddesh Shetty

- Directed by: Kanishka Sonthalia; Siddesh Shetty
- Cinematography: Siddesh Shetty
- Edited by: Audrey Maurion
- Music by: Jérôme Rebotier
- Production companies: Kopuku Films; Elda Productions
- Distributed by: Taskovski Films
- Release date: March 10, 2024 (Thessaloniki)
- Countries: India; France
- Language: Hindi

Until I Fly is a 2024 documentary film directed by Kanishka Sonthalia and Siddesh Shetty. An international co-production between India and France, the film follows five years in the life of Veeru, a young boy of mixed Indian and Nepalese heritage growing up in a remote Himalayan village. The film premiered at the Thessaloniki Documentary Festival in March 2024.

== Synopsis ==
The film focuses on Veeru, a young boy living in an Indian village near the border with Nepal. Because his mother is Indian and his father is Nepalese, Veeru faces regular bullying and xenophobia from other children in the village, who often call him a thief due to his background. His mother also deals with mental health issues, including bipolar disorder, and visual impairment, which makes her a target for local harassment as well.

Instead of fighting back against the village kids, Veeru focuses on nature and local myths about gods and demons. Later in the film, he gets into the sport of Kabaddi and ends up leading his village team to a win at a state championship.

== Production ==
Directors Kanishka Sonthalia and Siddesh Shetty first met Veeru's family in 2017 while they were hiking through the Himalayas. After learning about the family's situation, they decided to film Veeru's growth from childhood into his teenage years. The documentary was produced by Kopuku Films in India and Elda Productions in France. It was made in association with several television networks, including BBC Storyville and France Télévisions, and received development funding from the Al Jazeera Documentary Channel, SVT, and NRK.

== Release and distribution ==
In February 2024, Taskovski Films bought the worldwide distribution rights to the film. Until I Fly had its world premiere on March 10, 2024, at the 27th Thessaloniki Documentary Festival. The film later aired on television, including a broadcast on BBC Four as part of the Storyville series on November 26, 2024.

== Critical reception ==
Panos Kotzathanasis of Asian Movie Pulse gave the film a positive review, praising Shetty's landscape cinematography and Audrey Maurion's editing. Kotzathanasis noted that the documentary successfully uses a small, local story to talk about broader issues of migration and discrimination, while keeping a realistic but hopeful tone at the end.
