= Two Nice Jewish Boys =

Israeli podcast

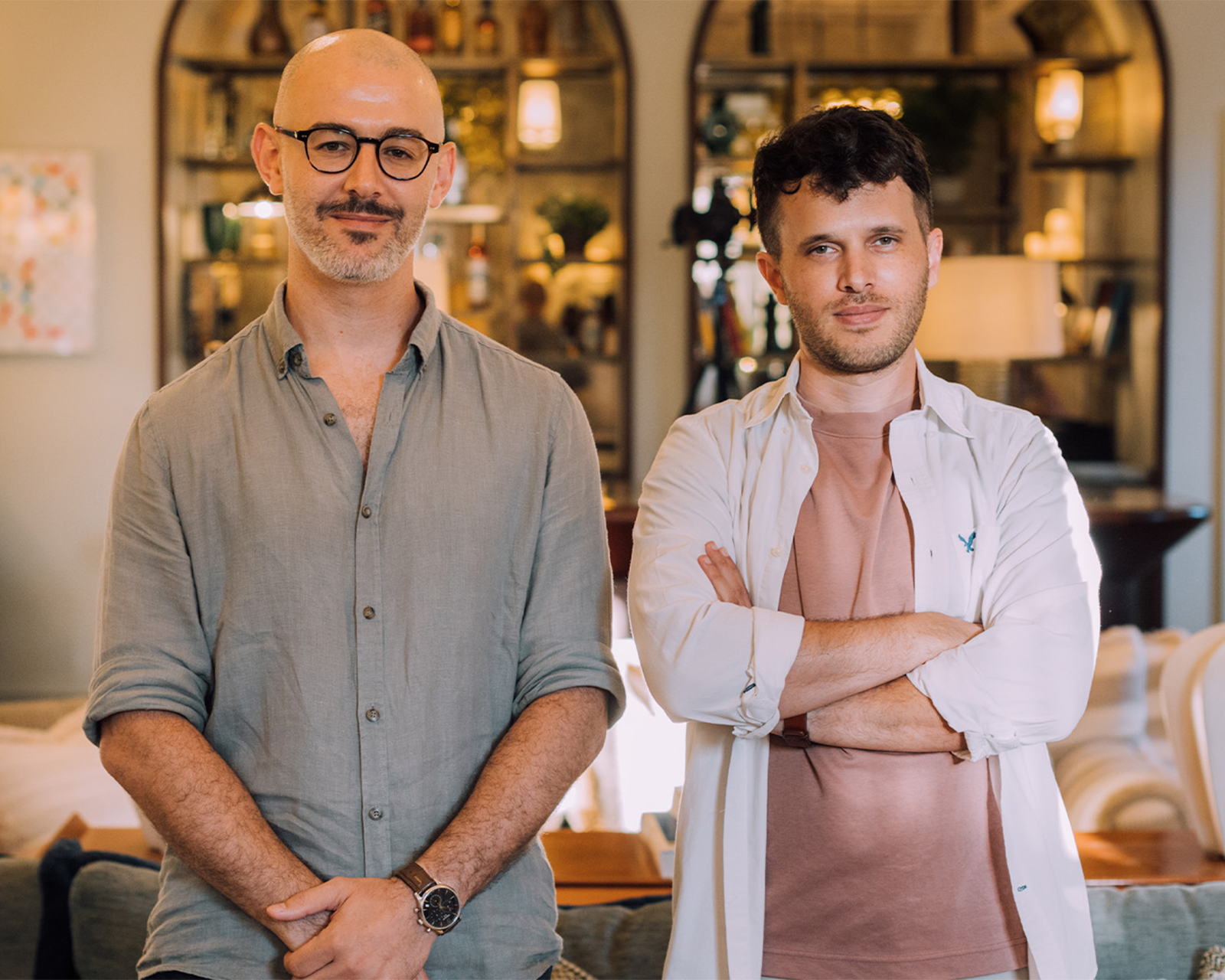
- Co-Hosts of the Two Nice Jewish Boys Podcast, Eytan Weinstein (left) and Naor Meningher (right)
- Genre: Talk
- Format: Audio; video
- Language: English

Cast and voices
- Hosted by: Naor Meningher and Eytan Weinstein

Technical specifications
- Video format: YouTube

Publication
- Original release: 2016
- Provider: YouTube (2017–present)

Related
- Website: 2njb.com

YouTube information
- Channel: Two Nice Jewish Boys
- Years active: 2017–present
- Subscribers: 10.8 thousand
- Views: 1.7 million
- Last updated: March 3, 2026

Two Nice Jewish Boys is a weekly Israeli English-language podcast. It is hosted by Naor Meningher and Eytan Weinstein. The podcast is about Israeli life, society, and politics, and has hosted a number of prominent guests. The podcast claims to be Israel's longest-running English-language podcast.

== History ==
Two Nice Jewish Boys was established in 2016 by Naor Meningher and Eytan Weinstein. Meningher, an independent film maker who grew up in Israel, and Weinstein, who moved to Israel from Birmingham, Alabama around 2007, met at Tel Aviv University's Steve Tisch School of Film and Television. Speaking to The Jerusalem Post in 2017, Meningher stated that his motivation to start the podcast were "Zionism and his love for Israel"; Weinstein felt that an English-language podcast would benefit people who had recently moved to Israel. Both said that Two Nice Jewish Boys was also aimed at the Jewish community outside Israel. Since 2017, the podcast has been hosted on The Jewish Journal.

The success of Two Nice Jewish Boys, which is self-funded, led to the creation of The Melting Podcast, which is hosted by Meningher and published by the Israeli Public Broadcasting Corporation, in 2017. The Melting Podcast is likewise aimed at English-speaking immigrants to Israel.

The podcast has hosted a number of high-profile guests, including Michael Oren, Dan Shechtman, Chaim Topol, Ania Bukstein, Tamar Zandberg, Robert Aumann, Deborah Lipstadt, Uri Geller, Noam Shuster-Eliassi, and Moshe Koppel.

== Controversies ==
=== 2021 response to John Oliver ===
In 2021, John Oliver criticised Israel's response to rocket fire from Gaza on Last Week Tonight, noting an imbalance of power between Israel and Palestine. Weinstein posted a negative response to Oliver's criticism on the Two Nice Jewish Boys YouTube channel. The video was removed for violating YouTube's hate speech policy, but later reinstated.

=== 2024 comments on the Gaza war ===
In September 2024, Two Nice Jewish Boys drew criticism for an episode about the Gaza war. In the episode Weinstein stated that if he was given "a button to just erase Gaza", he "would press it in a second", and claimed that this reflected the feelings of Israelis in general. The clip was later set to private. In an online argument, Weinstein denied that this was a call for genocide, and called his statement a "hypothetical". Around the same time, X removed a tweet from the podcast's account calling for the destruction of Gaza.
