= Tal Shefi =

Israeli film editor, director and screenwriter

Tal Shefi טל שפי
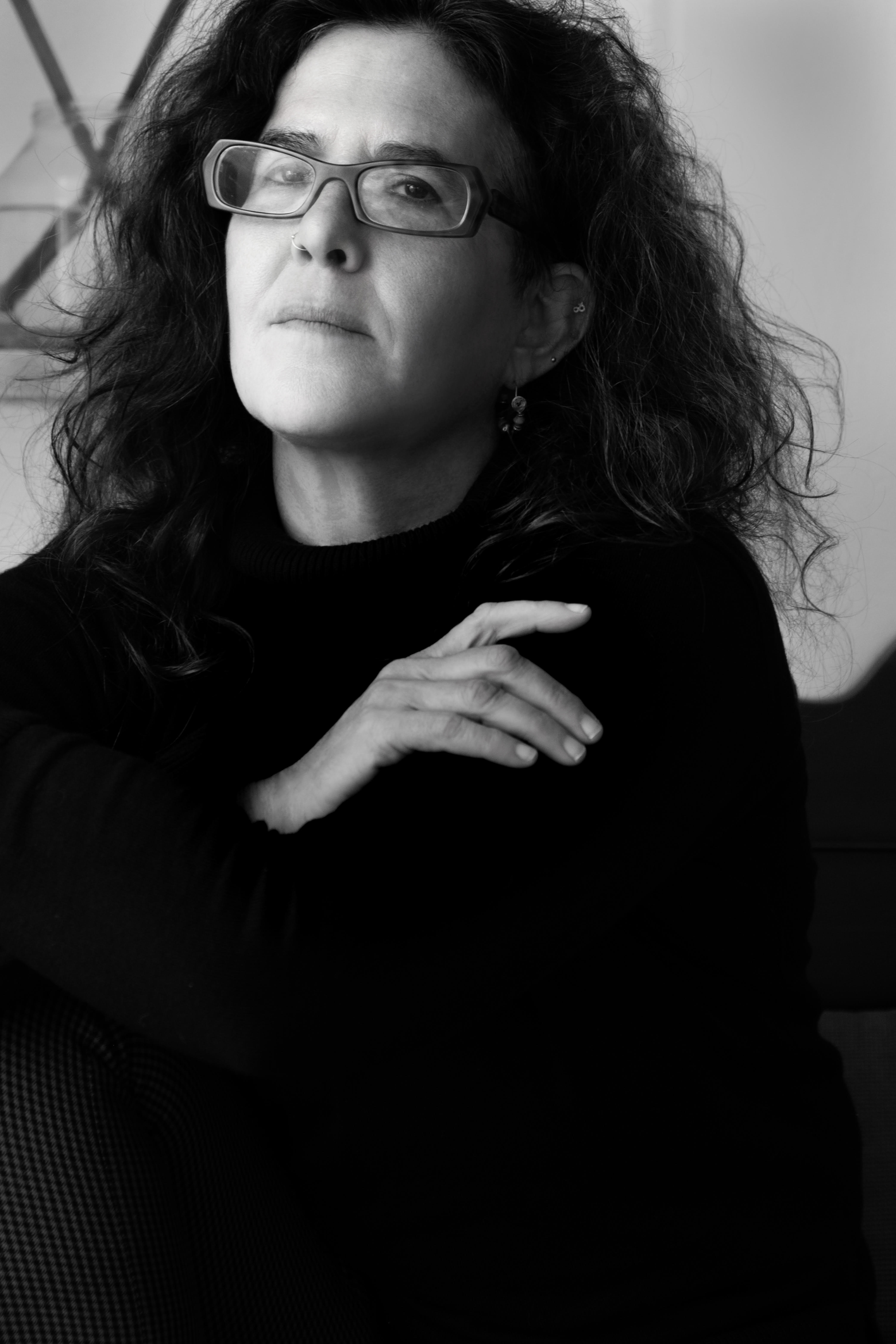
- Born: April 28, 1967 (age 59); Palo Alto, California
- Occupations: Film editor, film director, screenwriter, editing consultant, and film lecturer

Tal Shefi (Hebrew: טל שפי; born April 28, 1967) is an American-Israeli film editor, director and screenwriter.

== Biography ==
Shefi was born in Palo Alto, California, and grew up in Tel Aviv, Israel. Her parents are Hannah Ezrati, an immigrant from Saloniki, and Adam Shefi.

Shefi studied theater at Telma Yelin High School and at the Avshalom Democratic School. She then studied film at the Beit Zvi film school, and completed additional courses at the New School of Visual Arts in New York, and at AFI in Los Angeles.

Between 1999 and 2002, Shefi was co-founder of the film department and lead editing instructor at the Emek Yizrael College. Between 2002 and 2009, she lived in Goa, India, and there created her first film as a director, Not Your Life. She moved to India with her partner and their daughter, Kaya, then age 8. Kaya got involved in a local boxing club, and Shefi followed some of the girls on their journey in this non-traditional sports branch for the film. Kaya was home-schooled during this time, and also completed correspondence courses. They returned to Israel when she was 15. Since 2009, Shefi teaches at Jump Cut, a school for film editors and animators.

Shefi is a mentor and lecturer for various film funds and festivals, including DocAviv, Gesher Film Fund, and the Bernstein Foundation.

== Filmography ==
Year	Work	Role	Notes
2018	15 Years	Editor	
2018	God's Address	Editor	
2018	Consumption Habits	Editor	
2018	The Believers	Editor	Video Installation for Breda Photo Festival
2017	The Impure	Writer, editor	Documentary
2017	Before My Feet Touch the Ground	Writer, editor	Documentary
2017	Yizkor LeMenashiye	Editor	Documentary
2016	Off Guard	Writer, editor	Documentary
2015	Pedagogical Poem	Editor	Documentary
2014	There and Here	Editor	Documentary
2013	Not Your Life	Director, writer, cinematographer	Documentary
2013	The Lab	Editor	Documentary
2012-2013	The Albums	Editor	Documentary TV series
2012	The Way Back: Rivka Zohar Returns to New York	Editor	Documentary
2011	Life in Stills	Editor	Documentary
2010	Yellow Mums	Editor	Short
2010	Wide Angle	Editor	Documentary TV series
2010	Sperm Bank Kids	Editor	TV documentary
2010	Where's the Food?	Editor	Documentary TV series
2009	Alex, Pro and Con	Editor	Documentary TV series
2006	The Tea Boy of Gaza	Editor	Documentary, short
2003	Rutenberg	Editor	
2001	Ish Hahashmal	Editor	
2001	Dakot Shel Tehila	Editor	TV series
1999-2002	Ha-Chevre Ha-Tovim	Editor	TV series (38 episodes)
1999-2000	Shemesh	Editor	TV series (7 episodes)
1997	Florentine	Editor	TV series (7 episodes)
1994-1998	The Cameric Five	Editor	TV series
1994	Hashamen Im HaSony	Editor	Documentary TV series (several episodes)

== Awards ==
Year	Award	Category	Work	Result
2011	DocAviv	Best Editing	Life in Stills	won
2013	International Women's Film Festival In Rehovot	Most Promising Filmmaker	Not Your Life	won

== See also ==
- List of female film and television directors
