= Omar al-Qattan =

Palestinian film director

- Born: May 4, 1964 (age 61); Beirut, Lebanon
- Occupation(s): Film director and producer
- Title: Chairman, A. M. Qattan Foundation
- Parent(s): Abdel Mohsin Al-Qattan; Leila Miqdadi

Omar al-Qattan (Arabic: عمر القطان; born May 4, 1964) is a Palestinian Kuwaiti film director and film producer.

== Early life ==
Al-Qattan was born in Beirut, Lebanon to Palestinian parents. His father, Abdel Mohsin al-Qattan, came from Jaffa, which his family fled with thousands of other Arabs as a result of the 1948 Arab-Israeli War, becoming refugees. His mother, Leila Miqdadi, originally from Tulkarem, also fled Palestine with her family in 1948. Omar's parents met and married in Kuwait, where they started their careers as schoolteachers, before Abdel Mohsin first joined the Kuwaiti government as a senior manager and then started his own construction company. The family were naturalised in 1964 before moving to Beirut in 1975, where Omar lived until he was eleven years old. In 1975, the outbreak of the Lebanese Civil War, drove the family to scatter and Omar was sent to England where he attended boarding school. Upon graduation from high school in 1982, he spent seven months in Cairo, Egypt, studying Arabic & Islamic literature and history, following which he gained a BA in English Language and Literature from the University of Oxford. After graduating, he enrolled in INSAS film school in Brussels.

== Filming career ==
Al-Qattan began his filming career by directing 15 to 20-minute documentaries and dramas while at film school.

His first full-length film, Dreams & Silence, was a documentary released in 1991. The film portrayed a Palestinian woman refugee in Jordan and her struggles with the religious and social constraints around her at a time of great tension and anguish during and after Iraq's invasion of Kuwait. The documentary received the Joris Ivens Award and was broadcast in five European countries and Australia. In that same year, Al-Qattan settled in London where he founded, in partnership with Khleifi, Sourat UK in 1992, which later become Sindibad Films Ltd in 1993.

The company produced Tale of the Three Jewels (1995) and Forbidden Marriages in the Holy Land (1996). the former was the first feature film to be entirely shot in the Israeli-occupied Gaza Strip and received international awards after its premiere at the Director's Fortnight, Cannes. The latter is a documentary about mixed marriages between Jews and Arabs in Palestine/Israel. 1995 also saw the release of Going Home, a documentary on Derek Cooper, a British veteran of the Palestine Mandate, which focused on the central role of memory and justice in the process of reconciliation and was shown on Channel 4 TV.

In 2000 and 2001 Al-Qattan also co-directed Muhammad: Legacy of a Prophet, a two-hour documentary on Muhammad's life and his legacy with Muslims in the United States. Produced by Unity Productions Foundation, it was aired on American television by PBS on December 22, 2002. The film was criticized by some right-wing journalists as "too soft on the topic", but it won acclaim by the US public.

During this period, Al-Qattan began to give increasing attention to the A. M. Qattan Foundation, an independent institution established by his parents to support cultural and educational development in Palestine and the Arab World, launching its principal activities and establishing its operations in the Occupied West Bank and the Gaza Strip through three major tracks: the Qattan Centre for Educational Research & Development which supports school teachers to develop and improve their professional skills and knowledge; the Qattan Centre for the Child in Gaza City, a cultural centre for children under the age of 15 including a major library, theatre, IT lab and other facilities, including a mobile outreach programme; and the Culture & Arts Programme, a diverse funding mechanism for the arts, particularly among young people which is today one of the largest independently funded programmes of its kind in the region, working across the disciplines, including film and television, including the Palestinian Audio-visual Project and the Gaza Music School. In late 2008, the Programme also opened The Mosaic Rooms, a gallery and small cultural space in London focused on Arab culture which Al-Qattan continues to curate. The Foundation is today considered a pioneer and leader in its fields, both regionally and internationally.

Returning to cinema in 2008, Al-Qattan produced Khleifi's ZINDEEQ, winner of the best feature at the 2009 Dubai International Film Festival.

Al-Qattan is also a published writer and commentator and, since 2012 chair of the Palestinian Museum steering committee of the Association and of Shubbak 2013, the festival of contemporary Arab culture in London. Since 2005, he has also been deputy chair of Al-Hani Construction and Trading in Kuwait, the family firm established by his father in 1964.

== Filmography ==
- Je suis...tu es?, (1987), 16', director
- La Danse (1988), 19', director
- Conte de l'Aveugle et du Paralytique (1989), 18', director
- Cantique des Pierres (1990–91), dir: Michel Khleifi, 100', assistant
- L'Ordre du Jour (1992), dir: Michel Khleifi, co-producer
- Tale of the Three Jewels (1994–95), dir Michel Khleifi, executive producer
- Forbidden Marriages in the Holy Land (1995), dir Michel Khleifi, executive producer
- Going Home (1996), director and producer
- Jerusalem (1998), director and producer
- Homesick (1999), screenwriter
- 500 Dunam on the Moon, dir: Rachel Leah Jones, co-producer
- Amal, My Star (2000), producer
- Muhammad: Legacy of a Prophet (2000–02), co-director with Michael Schwarz
- Midwest/ Midwest Field (2002), producer
- Diary of an Art Competition (Under Occupation) (2002), director, producer and cameraman
- Route 181- Fragments of a Journey to Palestine and Israel (2003–04), dir by Michel Khleifi and Eyal Sivan, co-producer
