= Asma Azaizeh =

Palestinian poet

- أسماء عزايزة
- Born: 1985 (age 40–41); Daburriyah village, The lower Galilee
- Education: University of Haifa
- Title: Poet, journalist

Asma Azaizeh (Arabic: أسماء عزايزة; born 1985 in Daburriyah village, The lower Galilee) is a Palestinian poet. She currently works and lives in the city of Haifa.

== Education and career ==
Asma Azaizeh earned her bachelor's degree in journalism and English literature from the University of Haifa. She worked for several media outlets, including The Sun Radio where she worked in the news department, and al-Madina newspaper in Haifa, where she worked at the editorial department. She also worked as an editor at the Arab Foundation for human rights, where she edited the news and monthly reports. In addition, she hosted radio and television programs. Most recently, she worked as an artistic director at Fattoush bookstore and Fattoush gallery before the project was halted.

Her poetry collection Liwa won the Debut Writer Award from al-Qattan foundation in 2010. After that, she published two other poetry collections which are, As The Woman From Lod Bore Me (original title: Kama Waladatni al-Leddeyya) 2015 and Don’t Believe Me if I talked to you of War (original title: La Tosadiqoni en Hadathtukum an al-Harb) 2019. Her poems had been published in a poetry anthology for Palestinian and German poets, and some of her poems were translated into English, German, French, Persian, Swedish, Spanish, Slavic and more.

Azaizeh's on-going project is Courtyard of Poetry (original title: Fina’ al-She’r). She also writes articles about culture for newspapers and other Arab publishers, including Fusha Cultural Magazine, and she participates in poetry anthologies and poetry festivals around the world.

== Awards ==
Asma Azaizeh won the Debut Writer Award from A. M. Qattan Foundation in the field of poetry for the year 2010.

== Literary works ==
- Liwa (2011) which won the Debut Writer Award from al-Qattan foundation in 2010
- As The Woman From Lod Bore Me (original title: Kama Waladatni al-Leddeyya) (2015)
- Don’t Believe Me if I talked to you of War (original title: La Tosadiqoni en Hadathtukum an al-Harb) (2019)
