= Thessaloniki Documentary Festival =

Annual international documentary festival held in Thessaloniki, Greece

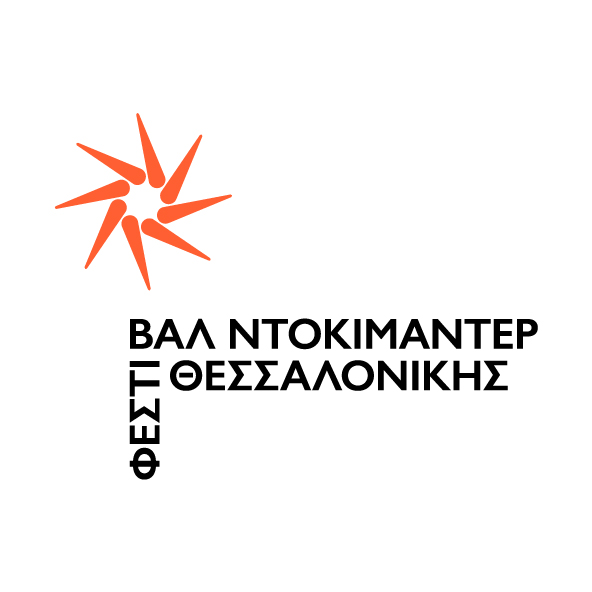
- Location: Thessaloniki, Greece
- Founded: 1999
- Most recent: 2025
- Awards: Golden Alexander Award
- Festival date: Opening: 6 March 2025; Closing: 16 March 2025
- Language: International
- Website: www.filmfestival.gr

Current: 27th
- 28th 26th

The Thessaloniki Documentary Festival (TDF; Greek: Φεστιβάλ Ντοκιμαντέρ Θεσσαλονίκης, romanized: Festivál Ntokimantér Thessaloníkis) is an international documentary festival held every March in Thessaloniki, Greece. TDF, founded in 1999, features competition sections and ranks among the world's leading documentary festivals. Since 2018, TDF is one of the 28 festivals included in the American Academy of Motion Picture, Arts and Sciences Documentary Feature Qualifying Festival List. TDF is organized by the Thessaloniki Film Festival cultural institution, which further organizes the annual Thessaloniki International Film Festival, held every November. French producer Elise Jalladeu is TDF's general director; film critic Orestes Andreadakis serves as its director.

== Overview ==
The Thessaloniki Documentary Festival focuses on independent documentary film and emerging documentarists from around the world. TDF is one of the leading documentary festivals globally, with an audience measuring up to 85.000 yearly.

TDF is held at the historical “Olympion” theater at the central Thessaloniki Aristotelous Square, at four theaters housed at two restored warehouses at the Thessaloniki Port, and at cinemas across Thessaloniki. The festival hub is Warehouse C, located at the city port.

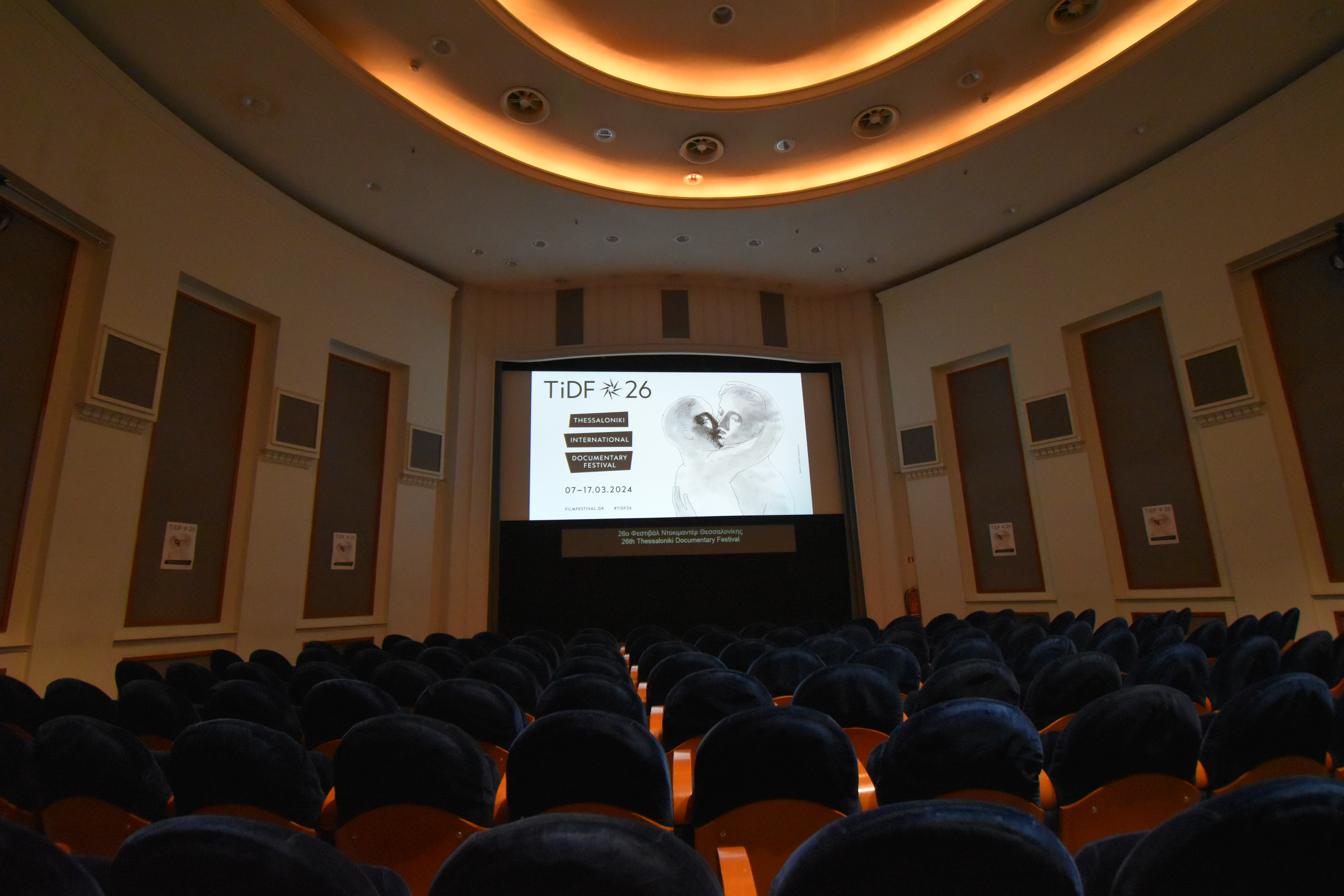
The Olympion during the Thessaloniki Documentary Festival 2024

== History ==
The Thessaloniki Documentary Festival was founded in 1999, an initiative of Dimitri Eipides, who served as TDF's director until 2016.

TDF's initial edition was organized with the contribution of an honorary international committee, consisting of prominent film auteurs as Chantal Ackerman, Judith Elek, Marceline Loridan-Ivens, Johan van der Keuken, Robert Kramer, Alexandr Sokurov, Frederick Wiseman, D.A. Pennebaker and others.

Since its 19th edition in 2017, TDF features competition sections, while from 2018 on, TDF hosts a Virtual Reality films competition section.

In 2018 TDF became one of the 28 festivals included in the American Academy of Motion Picture, Arts and Sciences Documentary Feature Qualifying Festival List; the film that wins TDF's “Golden Alexander” award for the Best Documentary in the International Competition section is automatically eligible to submit for Oscar consideration (Documentary Feature category).

In 2020, TDF's 22nd edition was held online from 19 to 28 May, for the first time in the festival's history, due to the global coronavirus pandemic.

The 25th edition was held in March 2023. In mourning of the Tempi train crash, all ceremonies and festive events were cancelled.

The 26th edition took place from 7 to 17 March 2024. It presented 36 films across three competition sections, with 35 of them having their world, international or European premieres.

The 27th edition took place from 6 to 16 March 2025 and the 28th edition took place from 5 to 15 March 2026.

== Notable guests and tributes ==
Leading documentarists that have attended TDF include Barbara Kopple, Kim Longinotto, Pirjo Honkasalo, Louie Psichoyos, Joe Berlinger, Bruce Sinofsky, Jennifer Fox, Claire Simon, Helena Třeštíková, Albert & David Maysles, Heddy Honigmann, Talal Derki, Fernando Trueba, Lauren Greenfield, Nicolas Philibert, Juliette Binoche, Bill Morrison and others.

Each year, TDF presents tributes and retrospectives to acclaimed auteurs and documentary movements. TDF has so far held the following tributes:

28th TDF – 2026

All the World's Memory: Tribute to Archives

Bill Morrison

Vouvoula Skoura

Anarchiving change: The Biennale 9 View

27th TDF – 2025

Lauren Greenfield

Nicolas Philibert

Geography of the Gaze: Off-Plan Greece (1950-2000)

AI, An Inevitable Intelligence

26th TDF – 2024

Citizen Queer

Dimitris Papaioannou

Fernando Trueba

Manifestos

Hortiatis Holocaust

Panayotis Evangelidis

Maria Kallas

25th TDF – 2023

Lewie and Noah Kloster

Stavros Kaplanidis

Destination: Journey

24th TDF – 2022

Motherland, I See You

Laila Pakalnina

Virpi Suutari

Post reality

23rd TDF – 2021

Lewie and Noah Kloster

Stavros Kaplanidis

Destination: Journey

22nd TDF – 2020

Animated documentaries

Anthropocene

Memes

21st TDF – 2019

Wang Bing

Gustav Deutsch

Spotlight: Eduardo Williams

Carte Blanche: Louie Psichoyos

Why Look at Animals?

20th TDF – 2018

Agnès Varda

Verena Paravel & Lucien Castaing-Taylor

’68 beyond ‘68

Carte Blanche: Sara Driver

19th TDF – 2017

Vitaly Mansky

John Berger

Angela Ricci Lucchi & Yervant Gianikian

Short Doc Experiments Oberhausen

Carte Blanche: Dimitri Eipides

18th TDF – 2016

Jong Bang Carlsen

Mark Cousins

17th TDF – 2015

Hubert Sauper

Alexandru Solomon

16th TDF – 2014

Peter Wintonick

Nicolas Philibert

15th TDF – 2013

Patricio Guzman

15 Years TDF: A Fascinating Journey

14th TDF – 2012

Eyal Sivan

Angelos Abazoglou

Spotlight: with Remarkable People

Docville

Danish Docs

Balkan focus

13th TDF – 2011

Sergei Loznitsa

Helena Třeštíková

Kyriaki Malama

Spotlight: Middle East

African Stories

12th TDF – 2010

Joris Ivens

Krzysztof Kieślowski

Andrzej Fidyk

Spotlight: Polish docs, Docs on North Korea, Aegean stories

Hybrid Docs

African Stories

11th TDF – 2009

Peter Wintonick

Stefan Schwietert

Fotos Lambrinos

Spotlight: Mexican docs, Austrian docs

Hybrid Docs

Theme: Africa from Within

10th TDF – 2008

Focus on Asia

Theme: Faces of Fascism

Canadian docs

Joe Berlinger & Bruce Sinofsky

Arto Halonen

War Zone

9th TDF – 2007

Focus on Asia

Theme: troubled innocence

Games we play

Barbara Kopple

Jon Alpert

Julia Reichert & Steven Bognar

World Musicians

Dutch Docs

8th TDF – 2006

Current Issues: globalization

Theme: Africa, unresolved issues

The politics of violence – part 2

Kim Longinotto

Exandas – Documentaries of the world

Nordic Docs

7th TDF – 2005

Theme: Immigration – Refugees

Spotlight: Pirjo Honkasalo

Auschwitz – The nightmare, 60 Years On

Focus: The Human RIghts Watch

Ethnographic Cinema: Dedicated to Jean Rouch

Pierre Perrault

Olympic Games: Greek docs

6th TDF – 2004

Current Issues: Terrorism – The Politics of Violence

Cinema Lessons: Decoding our World – Theo Angelopoulos, Abbas Kiarostami

Stefan Jarl

Spotlight: Heddy Honigmann

5th TDF – 2003

Contemporary Issues: Palestine

Spotlight: Margaret Smilow, Nicolas Philibert, Michael Moore, Apostolos Kryonas, Mary Hadjimichali-Papaliou, Yannis Smaragdis

4th TDF – 2002

Focus on: Children of a Harsh Reality

Bruce Weber

Monika Treut

Werner Herzog

3rd TDF – 2001

Albert & David Maysles

Docs from Iran

Lefteris Xanthopoulos

Yugoslavia in Focus: Anatomy of Horror

2nd TDF – 2000

Gypsies: Lives without Borders

D.A. Pennebaker: Rock’ n’ Roll Concerts

Backstage and literature

Tassos Psarras

1st TDF – 1999

Dimitris Mavrikios

== Festival sections ==
The Thessaloniki Documentary Festival comprises the following sections:

- Feature Length International Competition, screening films over 70 minutes in length that compete for the “Golden Alexander” Award and the Special Jury Award.
- “Newcomers” International Competition, screening the first or second film by emerging documentarists from around the world.
- “Film Forward” International Competition, screening innovative and experimental documentaries.
- Virtual Reality (VR) International Competition.
- Top Docs, screening films by major auteurs or films that have successfully toured the festival circuit.
- Open Horizons, TDF's section hosting the best of independent documentary film from around the world.
- Platform, showcasing the year's Greek documentary production.
- From Screen to Screen, screening Greek documentaries previously broadcast on TV.
- Docs for Kids, TDF's section dedicated to children and younger audiences.

TDF's program further includes sidebar events such as lectures, masterclasses, concerts, exhibitions and workshops.

== Agora Doc Market ==
The Agora Doc Market was launched in 1999, along with the first Thessaloniki Documentary Festival. The actions of the Agora Doc Market match the needs of film directors from Central and Southeastern Europe and the Mediterranean.

The Agora Doc Market is the developmental arm of the Thessaloniki Documentary Festival, which aims to bring together an international network of professionals, serving as an ideal place for meetings, discussions and professional deals, in a welcoming and professional ambience.

The Agora Doc Market includes the following clusters:

Agora Doc Market

The Agora Doc Market online Video Library (via Cinando) promotes the majority of films participating in TDF's program, but also a large number of European documentaries without a sales agent. The films remain online one and a half month after the end of the festival.

Docs in Progress

Agora DiP gives the chance to selected sales agents, distributors and festival programmers to view feature films from the Mediterranean and the Balkan countries that are currently one step away from their completion.

Thessaloniki Pitching Forum

The newly established Pitching Forum is a co-financing and co-production platform dedicated to projects from Southeastern Europe, the Eastern Mediterranean countries and the Middle East. It consists of a two-day workshop, an all-day Pitching Forum and two-day round table meetings.

The Agora Doc Market further hosts masterclasses, the Agora Lab, Doc Counseling, as well as the Meet the Future initiative, supporting emerging documentary filmmakers from the Balkans and Southeastern Europe.

== Awards ==
TDF hands the following awards:

- Feature Length International Competition:“Golden Alexander” Award, accompanied by a 15.000 euros cash prize, and the Special Jury Award, accompanied by a 5.000 euros cash prize.
- “Newcomers” International Competition: “Golden Alexander” Award, accompanied by an 8.000 euros cash prize, and the Special Jury Award, accompanied by a 3.000 euros cash prize.
- “Film Forward” International Competition: “Golden Alexander” Award, accompanied by a 3.000 euros cash prize.
- Virtual Reality (VR) International Competition: Best VR Film Award, accompanied by a 3.000 euros cash prize.
- “Mermaid Award” for the best LGBTQI-themed documentary.

Independent juries hand parallel awards, including two FIPRESCI awards (one for the Best Documentary competing at the Feature Length International Competition, and one for the Best Greek Documentary screened in TDF's official program), the “Human Values Award” granted by the Hellenic Parliament, the Amnesty International award, the Youth Jury Awards by the students of the Thessaloniki Universities, the Hellenic Broadcasting Corporation awards, the WIFT GR Award to a woman filmmaker of a film selected for TDF's official program and the Greek Association of Film Critics award.

Four Audience Awards, sponsored by Fischer beer, are presented to two Greek documentaries (under and over 50 minutes in length) and two international documentaries (under and over 50 minutes in length).

== Award-winning films ==
The “Golden Alexander” award for the Best Documentary in the Feature Length International Competition section has been awarded to the following films:

- 2016 - What He Did, Jonas Poher Rasmussen (Denmark)
- 2017 - Dream Empire, David Borenstein (Denmark)
- 2018 - The Distant Barking of Dogs, Simon Lereng Wilmont (Denmark, Finland, Sweden)
- 2019 - Advocate, Rachel Leah Jones and Philippe Bellaïche (Israel, Canada, Switzerland)
- 2020 - Welcome to Chechnya, David France (USA)
- 2022 - A House Made of Splinters, Simon Lereng Wilmont (Denmark, Finland, Sweden, Ukraine)
- 2023 - Under the Sky of Damascus, Talal Derki, Heba Khaled, Ali Wajeeh (Denmark, Germany, USA)
- 2024 - My Stolen Planet, Farahnaz Sharifi
- 2025 - Coexistence, My Ass!, Amber Fares
- 2026 - Closure, Michał Marczak

== Gallery ==
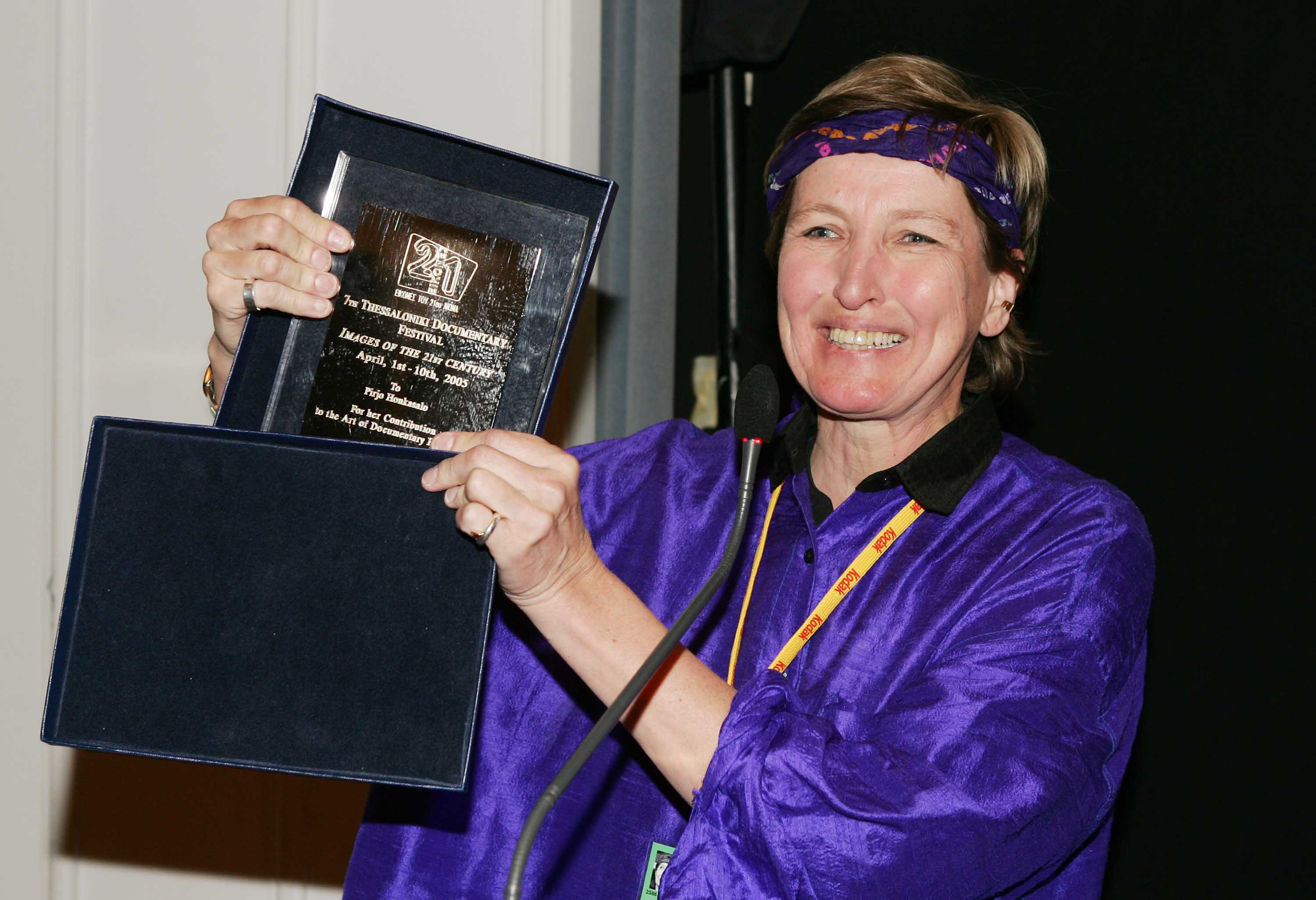
Pirjo Honkasalo awarded at the 7th Thessaloniki Documentary Festival (2005)

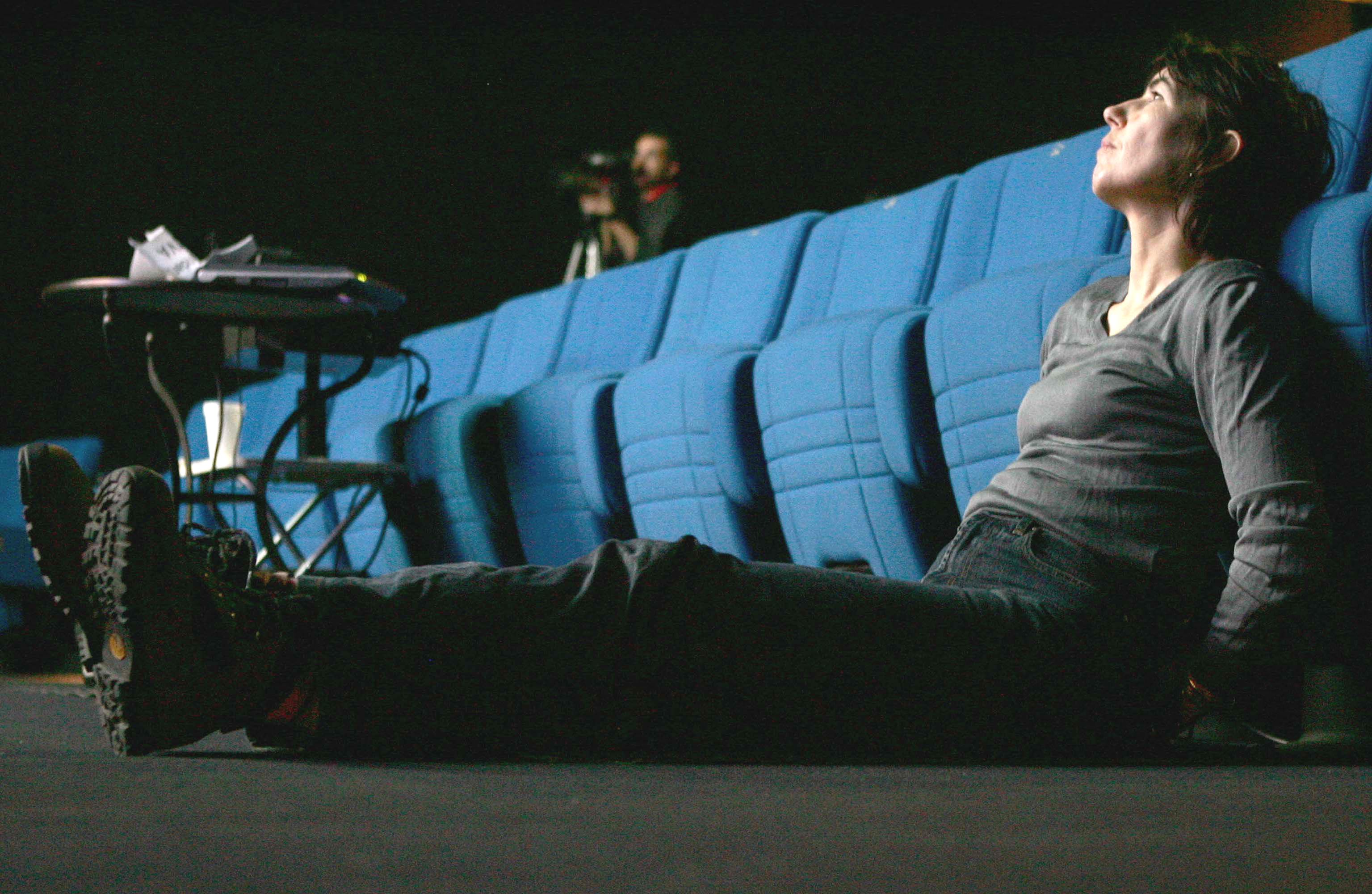
Kim Longinotto during her masterclass at the 8th TDF (2006)

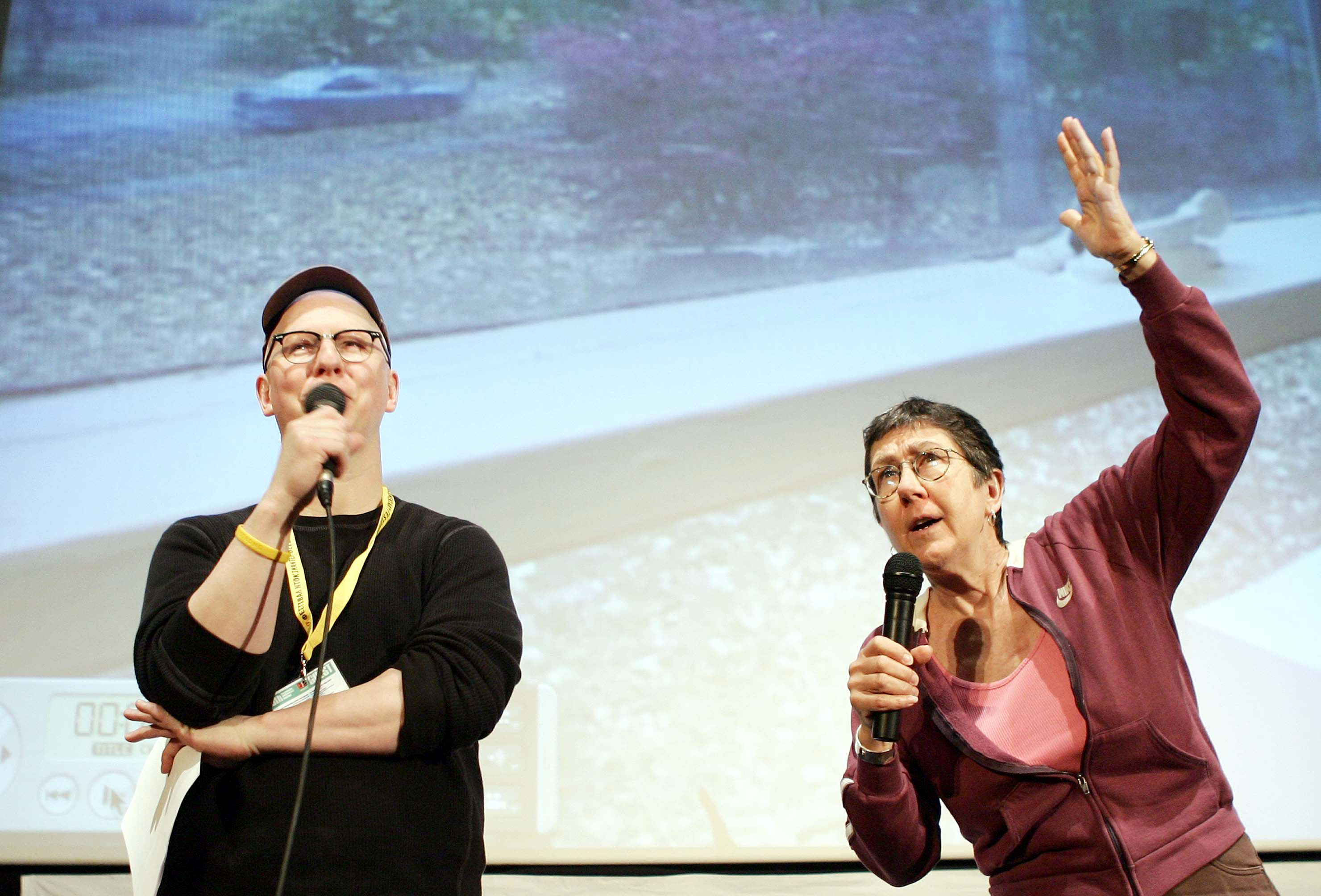
Steve Bognar and Julia Reichert during a masterclass at the 9th Thessaloniki Documentary Festival (2007)

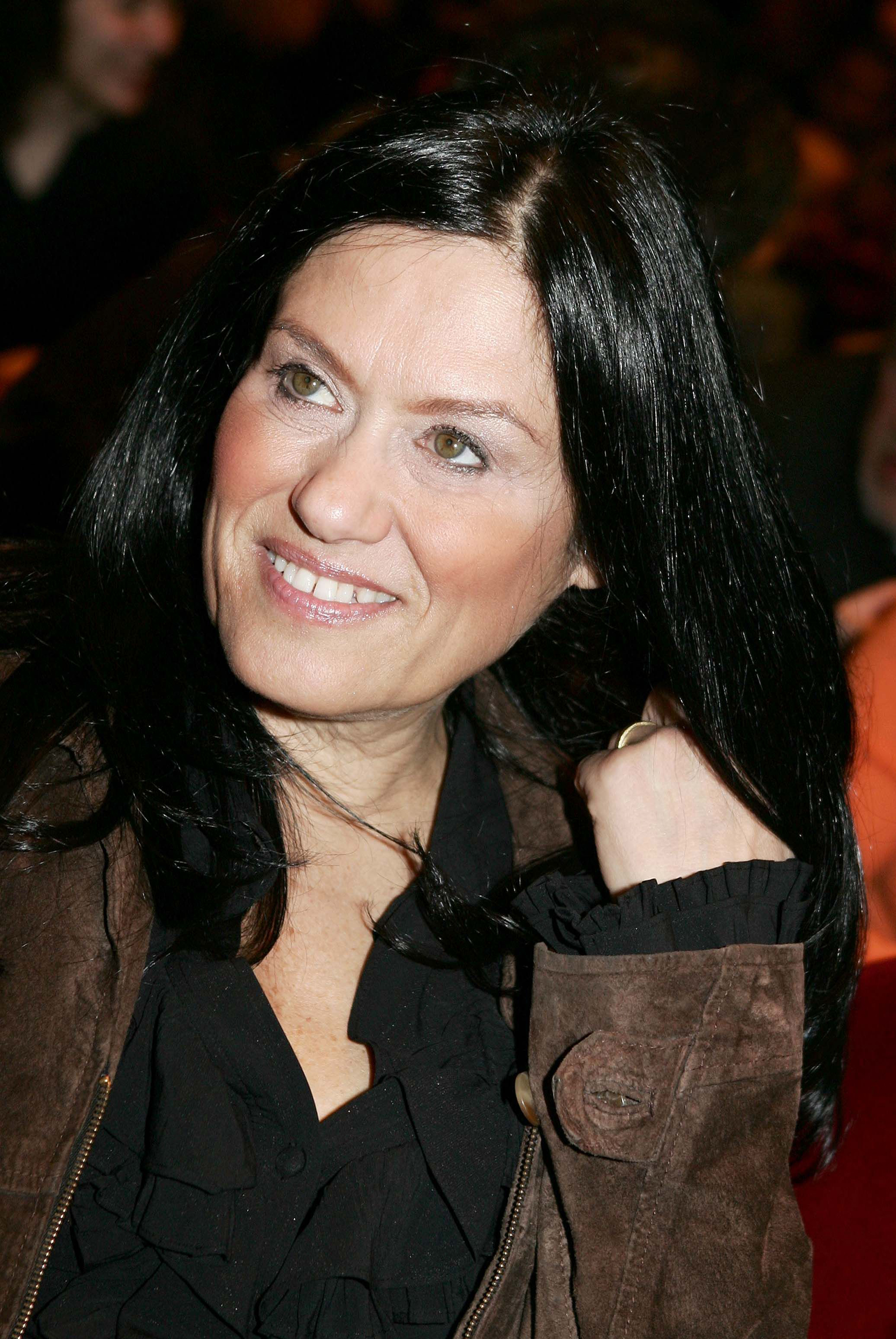
Barbara Kopple at the 9th Thessaloniki Documentary Festival (2007)

== See also ==
- Thessaloniki International Film Festival
