= Speed Sisters =

- Film poster
- Directed by: Amber Fares
- Produced by: Amber Fares; Avi Goldstein; Jessica Devaney
- Starring: The Speed Sisters
- Edited by: Rabab Haj Yahya
- Production company: SocDoc Studios
- Distributed by: Dogwoof, First Run Features, Blue Ice Docs
- Release dates: 29 April 2015 (Hot Docs); 25 March 2016 (United Kingdom)
- Running time: 78 minutes
- Countries: Palestine; United States; Qatar; United Kingdom; Denmark; Canada
- Languages: Arabic, English

Speed Sisters is a 2015 documentary film by Amber Fares that follows the all-female Palestinian racing team the Speed Sisters and explores the social issues surrounding their career. It was pitched at the 2011 MeetMarket part of Sheffield Doc/Fest.

== Production ==
The film is an international co-production between companies in Palestine, the United States, Qatar, the United Kingdom, Denmark and Canada.

== Reception ==
Speed Sisters received generally positive reviews from critics. On Rotten Tomatoes, the film has an 80% score based on 5 reviews, with an average rating of 7.7/10.
