= Abdel Mohsin Al-Qattan =

Palestinian businessman and politician

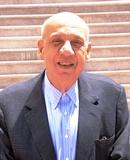
- Abdel Mohsin Al-Qattan
- Born: 5 November 1929; Jaffa, Mandatory Palestine (now Israel)
- Died: 4 December 2017 (aged 88)
- Education: American University of Beirut
- Occupation: Businessman
- Known for: Founder, A. M. Qattan Foundation
- Children: 4, including Omar Al-Qattan

Abdel Mohsin Al-Qattan (5 November 1929 - 4 December 2017) was a Palestinian businessman and politician.

Al-Qattan was born on 5 November 1929 in Jaffa. He was educated at Ayyubid School in Jaffa, followed by An-Nahda College in Jerusalem. In 1947, he enrolled at the American University of Beirut and earned a degree in business studies.

In 1993, he founded the A. M. Qattan Foundation, a not-for-profit developmental organisation based in Ramallah. The chairman is his son Omar Al-Qattan.

In June 2018, the Foundation opened a $21 million headquarters building and arts centre in Ramallah.
