= Advocate (2019 film) =

2019 documentary film

- Directed by: Rachel Leah Jones; Philippe Bellaïche
- Starring: Lea Tsemel
- Release dates: 27 January 2019 (USA); 23 May 2019 (Israel)
- Running time: 108 minutes
- Country: Israel
- Languages: Hebrew; Arabic
- Box office: $16,942

Advocate is a 2019 Israeli documentary film, directed by Rachel Leah Jones and Philippe Bellaïche. The film premiered at the 2019 Sundance Festival, and went on to win top prizes at Thessaloniki Documentary Festival, Kraków Film Festival, Hong Kong International Film Festival and Docaviv Festival. Advocate won the Emmy for Best Documentary in the 42nd News and Documentary Emmy Awards.

== Synopsis ==
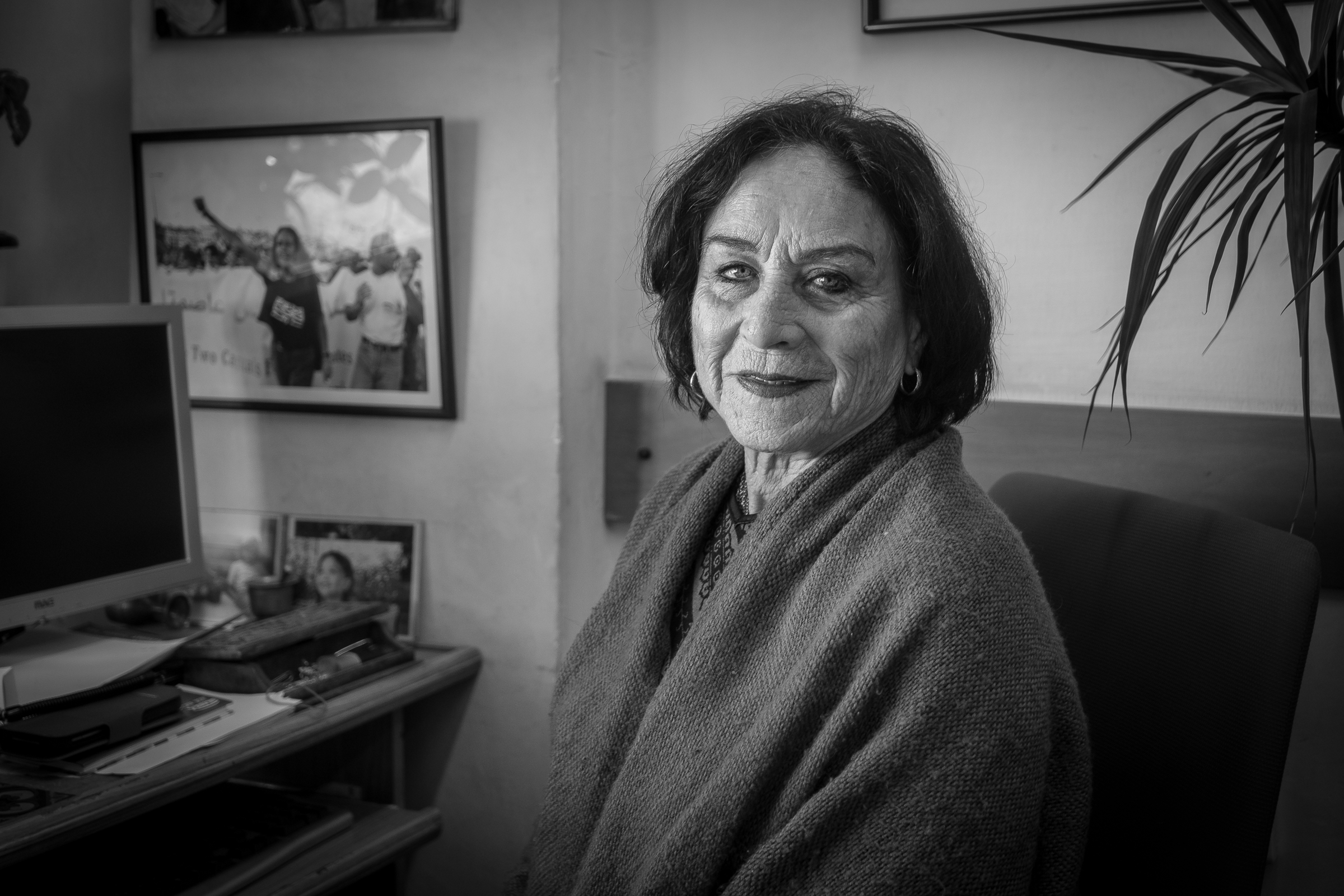
Leah Tsemel (2019)

The film follows Jewish-Israeli human-rights lawyer Lea Tsemel as she navigates through the Israeli judicial system in defense of Palestinians accused of terrorism. The film includes archival footage of past cases Tsemel was involved in over a five-decade long career; interviews with Tsemel and her family members, including her husband, Michel Warschawski and their daughter and son, as well as interns and associates at Tsemel's law firm; and closely follows two contemporary cases represented by Tsemel and her co-counsel, Tareq Barghout.

The first case the film follows is that of 13 year old Ahmad, who together with his 15 year old cousin, Hassan, took to the street with knives. The episode led to the non-fatal stabbing of an Israeli teenager by Hassan, who was then killed by security forces. Though no evidence is presented that Ahmad participated in the stabbing, or planned to use his decorative knife to harm anyone, he is convicted on two counts of attempted murder. The second case is that of Israa Jaabis, who is charged with attempted murder for an act that is interpreted by Israeli officials as a suicide bombing gone wrong. Jaabis had set fire to her car, into which she had placed two butane tanks. She was severely injured, and a policeman was lightly injured. Tsemel learned from Jaabis' relatives that she was depressed and unhappy in her marriage, and had attempted suicide twice before. Tsemel wondered if this time Jaabis had intended "suicide by cop" rather than a politically-motivated attack. However, the court was not convinced, and ruled that her sole intent was to kill.

Tsemel explains her commitment to representing Palestinian defendants, whether or not they committed the acts they are accused of, as her responsibility as a member and beneficiary of the conquering power, under which the Palestinians must live, and against which they are justified in struggling for their liberation. She says, "Israelis have no right to tell Palestinians how to struggle." When the television interviewer says she cannot understand this attitude, she answers, "You should try to understand me because I am the future.” She calls herself "an angry optimistic woman", and while she is seen by some as a hero and role model, she is seen by others as a traitor, and has long been the recipient of death threats and vilification, including various epithets by which she is known, including "devil's advocate".

The film incorporates animation in several parts, to protect the identity of various persons.

== Production ==
Advocate was produced by the Israeli Home Made Docs, by the Canadian outfit Film Option, and by Swiss groups Close Up Films, RTS Radio Télévision Suisse and SRG SSR.

== Release ==
Advocate's world premiere took place at the 2019 Sundance Film Festival, where it was a nominee for the World Cinema Documentary Competition award. It premiered in Israel at the Docaviv festival on 23 May 2019, where it won the top award. The film opened the 2019 Human Rights Watch Film Festival in New York City, and plucked top prizes at the Kraków Film Festival, Hong Kong, Docaviv and Thessaloniki festivals. Advocate's Israeli theater premier took place on September 5, 2019, when it opened at theaters nationwide.

The film opened in theaters in the United States on January 3, 2020, and ranked second in the list of in-year releases highest-grossing films for that week.

== Critical reception ==
The film was enthusiastically received by film critics and audiences alike. On Rotten Tomatoes, the film has a score of 100%, based on 18 reviews, including the New York Times, Variety, The Hollywood Reporter, Los Angeles Times and Sight & Sound magazines.

In her Modern Times review, Bianca-Olivia Nita calls Advocate "infuriating" as well as "inspirational and full of heart". She concludes: It ends in hope that, as long as there are people still living with compassion, there is still a chance for resolution, even if that resolution is – for now – nowhere in sight. It captures the humanity and pain that lays behind aggression and labels, building an insightful picture of a flawed judicial system. One that brings no justice and more pain for those living in what seems a hopeless conflict in a part of the world we choose" to see as very far away."

The British Film Institute review calls the film "gripping", and terms it "by turns inspiring and despairing, settling as a deeply bittersweet portrait of a magnetic individual." Georgia Del Don, reviewing Advocate for Cineuropa, warns viewers that "'the devil’s advocate', as she’s called by many of her Israeli colleagues, has none of the charisma or the motherly devotion of a Mother Teresa character, for example. In fact, it is around the nature of her charisma, which is impossible to label or pin down, that Rachel Leah Jones and Philippe Bellaïche construct their film, a portrayal of a strong female figure who defies each and every convention. Courageous, fun, seductive and unconventional to the say the least, Lea Tsemel embodies an ideal which goes beyond gender and which men and women can both aspire to."

Hollywood Reporter critic Keith Uhlich points out that what would seemingly be a disadvantage to the film – the prohibition of cameras in the courtrooms – actually works to the film's dramatic advantage, heightening the drama of the defendants, attorneys, friends and family nervously waiting in corridors. He adds, "Watching these two trials through to their end lends additional credence to Tsemel's perspective that the Israeli legal system is rigged against Palestinians from the get-go, regardless of their guilt or innocence. How can justice prevail when autocratic impulses so consistently pervert democratic ideals?"

In his Los Angeles Times review, Kenneth Turan wrote: "Lea Tsemel has been called a rebel with a lost cause and a whole lot worse. But as the intimate, powerful “Advocate” demonstrates, she lives up to the film's title in the purest sense of the word: She stands up for people. It's who she stands up for that causes all the controversy."

Israeli critic, Erez Dvorah, writes that it is the very controversial nature of Tsemel and her work that makes Advocate required viewing for people from all quadrants of the political map, calling the existence of such a film "essential to the democracy of Israel, in an era where the media is more and more controlled by political agendas ... A society in which there is a categorical rejection of this type of film is a society taking a significant step farther away from what is commonly called 'democracy'".

Following its being short-listed for an Academy Award, a review of Advocate was published in Variety. Reviewer Guy Lodge calls Advocate "a sober, engrossing documentary... A gripping procedural that intelligently expands into more searching questions over the Israel-Palestine divide and one woman’s precarious, often unpopular role as what some may call a mediator and others, well, a devil’s advocate." Quoting Tsemel, who calls herself "a very angry, optimistic woman", Lodge notes that this is not a contradiction in terms, but rather: "it does highlight two traits that are rarely twinned, particularly to positive effect." He concludes: "Advocate isn’t a bland hagiography, but a textured nonfiction character study of complicated heroism. You can’t challenge the system, after all, without being a bit challenging yourself."

The film won the Best Documentary Emmy award in 2021.

== Political fallout in Israel ==
Upon winning the top award in the Israeli Docaviv film festival, Israel's Culture Minister Miri Regev attacked the film and “the choice to make a movie focusing on a lawyer who represents, supports and speaks in the name of many who undermine the State of Israel’s existence, use terrorism against its soldiers and people, and win legal and public support from Tsemel.” Right-wing activists and organizations, including Im Tirtzu, picketed Mifal HaPayis, Israel's national lottery company and the sponsor of Docaviv's main prize, which shortly after announced it would pull funding for future Docaviv festival awards due to pressure from right-wing activists. The decision caused a media uproar, and in response, hundreds of Israeli filmmakers, as well as academics and public figures signed an open letter in support of the film. The Cultural Institutions Forum and multiple creative and artists associations mounted a protest before the organization's offices. Two Sapir Award (also sponsored by Mifal HaPayis) judges resigned in protest, while three writers (Naomi Levitsky, Leah Inni and Orit Wolfiler) withdrew their nominations for this award, and dozens of other writers announced that should they ever win this award, they would give some of the money to the filmmakers.

Following the public outrage and many disruptions, Mifal HaPayis announced in September that it would honor the commitment to fund the award, by providing the award monies to Docaviv instead of the filmmakers themselves.

On November 6, 2019, the mayor of Ma'alot-Tarshiha, a municipality in northern Israel formed by a merger of a Jewish and an Arab town, cancelled the screening of Advocate that was scheduled for November 9, as part of the Docaviv Galilee Film Festival. The cancellation followed a petition by right-wing residents of Ma'alot, and a letter to Mayor Arkady Pomeranets from then Culture and Sports Minister Miri Regev, urging him to forbid the showing of the film as "something that should never occur on a stage that is supported by the State of Israel", and acknowledging that she lacks the legal authority to do so herself. Pomeranets accommodated Regev's request, though he himself had not seen the film, citing potential sensitivity of Ma'alot residents to the film's subject, due to the town having been the target of a terror attack in 1974, and in spite of being aware that the Attorney General stated that the mayor lacks authority to do so.

Docaviv responded that "The festival protests the arbitrary and unilateral decision on the part of the mayor to interfere in the content of the festival and to censor the grand-prize winning film of the Tel Aviv festival... We will not give a hand to censoring and silencing cultural and artistic works or to political maneuvers designed to do damage to the discourse that reflects the reality in Israel in all its different forms." The Association for Civil Rights in Israel asked the deputy attorney general to instruct Regev that she acted illegally "and misled the mayor into believing that he is authorized to attack freedom of expression". The attorney general's office, on November 8, issued an opinion that "No basis was introduced that establishes such exceptional or extreme circumstances that would allow for freedom of expression to be violated by cancelling the screening.... The message projected by the leadership, that activities of cultural institutions and artists are constantly under the watchful eye of government authorities and subject to supervision and monitoring in order to adapt their content to government tastes – harms the foundation of freedom of expression."

An alternative screening was quickly arranged in nearby kibbutz Kabri by Docaviv, and a protest screening was also arranged outside of the Ma'alot-Tarshiha cultural center by the Israel Documentary Forum and the Filmmakers Union. At the cultural center screening, about 150 anti-censorship activists protested, while about 200 right-wing counter-demonstrators spat at them, threatened the festival's director and flung incendiary devices. The police intervened and moved the right-wing demonstrators back, though two attending filmmakers, Yael Kipper and Ronen Zaretzky, were nevertheless attacked while leaving the event. Ultimately, the police asked the organizers to end the screening to avoid further violence, and the organizers complied. At Kabri, a right-wing demonstration was organized by activist Tsachi Eliyahu, who disrupted the screening, stormed the stage with his hands painted red, and proceeded to denounce the screening and the film.

Liran Atzmor, on behalf of the Documentary Forum, said: "We have come to demonstrate, the creators' unions and the citizens of the north, who are deeply disturbed by the illegal act of the mayor of Ma'alot-Tarshiha. This is silencing and censorship ... The mayor axed it, but in spite of the attorney general informing him that his axe is illegal, he nevertheless did not allow this screening, so we came here with a big screen and a loudspeaker so that the people of the North can see the film and decide for themselves. It is a very slippery slope, if we do not oppose this now, every mayor will then decide [what content can be screened] and the artistic field will completely lose its power and autonomy."

Notwithstanding the controversy, Advocate was screened in select theaters throughout Israel until January 2020, as well as on Hot's documentary Channel 8 and Hot VOD.

== Awards ==
Advocate is currently short-listed for the Academy Awards and European Film Awards.

Year	Award	Category	Result
2019	Asian Pacific Screen Awards	Best Documentary Feature Film	Won
2019	Academy Award	Best Documentary Feature	Shortlisted
2019	Antenna International Documentary Film Festival	Best Feature Film	Nominated
2019	Antenna International Documentary Film Festival	Audience Choice Award	Won
2019	Asia Pacific Film Awards	Best Documentary Feature Film	Won
2019	European Film Award	Best Documentary	Longlisted
2019	Loft Film Fest	CICAE Art Cinema Award	Won
2019	Cinema Eye Honors	Unforgettable Documentary Subject	Won
2019	Copenhagen International Documentary Film Festival	Politiken's Audience Award	Nominated
2019	Docaviv	Best Israeli Film	Won
2019	Dokufest International Documentary and Short Film Festival	Human Rights Award	Nominated
2019	Hong Kong International Film Festival	Jury Award: Best Documentary	Won
2019	Hong Kong International Film Festival	Golden Firebird Award	Nominated
2019	IDA Documentary Awards	Best Feature Film	Nominated
2019	IDA Documentary Awards	Best Director (Rachel Leah Jones, Philippe Bellaiche)	Nominated
2019	Israel Documentary Film Forum	Best Documentary Feature	Won
2019	Israel Documentary Film Forum	Best Editing	Won
2019	Krakow Film Festival	Golden Horn Award for Best Feature-Length Documentary	Won
2019	Philadelphia Film Festival	Best Documentary Feature	Nominated
2019	Producers Guild of America	Outstanding Producer of Documentary Theatrical Motion Picture	Nominated
2019	Sundance Film Festival	World Cinema - Documentary	Nominated
2019	Thessaloniki Documentary Film Festival	FIPRESCI Award	Won
2019	Thessaloniki Documentary Film Festival	Golden Alexander Award	Won
2019	Transatlantyk Festival: Lodz	Kaleidoscope Award	Nominated
2019	UK Jewish Film Festival	Best Documentary	Won
2020	Palm Springs International Film Festival	GoE Bridging the Borders Award	Won
2020	Ophir Award	Best Documentary (over 60 minutes)	Won
2021	News & Documentary Emmy Award	Best Documentary	Won
