= Coexistence, My Ass! =

- Directed by: Amber Fares
- Written by: Rachel Leah Jones; Rabab Haj Yahya
- Produced by: Amber Fares; Rachel Leah Jones
- Starring: Noam Shuster-Eliassi
- Cinematography: Amber Fares; Philippe Bellaiche; Amit Chachamov
- Edited by: Rabab Haj Yahya
- Music by: William Ryan Fritch
- Production companies: My Teez Production; Home Made Docs; Little Big Story; Intuitive Pictures
- Release date: January 26, 2025 (Sundance)
- Running time: 91 minutes
- Countries: United States; France
- Languages: English; Arabic; Hebrew; Persian
- Box office: $37,729

Coexistence, My Ass! is a 2025 documentary film produced and directed by Amber Fares, written by Rachel Leah Jones and Rabab Haj Yahya. It follows Israeli comedian Noam Shuster-Eliassi as she crafts a one-woman show, tackling inequality and the Israeli–Palestinian conflict.

The film had its world premiere at the 2025 Sundance Film Festival on January 26.

== Synopsis ==
The documentary, filmed from 2019–2024, follows Israeli comedian and peace activist Noam Shuster-Eliassi. She was raised in Neve Shalom/Wahat al-Salam, where she grew up immersed in a vision of Israeli/Palestinian coexistence rooted in equality and justice. After working as a peace activist with the United Nations, she turned to comedy as a more effective means of conveying her message.

The film traces Shuster-Eliassi’s stand-up routines, satirical videos on social media, and television appearances, highlighting how she uses humor to expose the absurdity of ethnic and religious hatred and to advocate for equality. It shows how she confronts rising violence against Palestinians, emboldened Jewish settler extremism, and the policies of Prime Minister Netanyahu. Her participation in nationwide protests reveals how efforts to spotlight discrimination were often dismissed even by fellow demonstrators.

The final section follows her through the trauma and grief after the October 7, 2023 Hamas attacks and Israel’s devastating response in Gaza. Torn between communities she loves, she mourns the tens of thousands of deaths and rejects the idea that further violence can bring peace. She notes that solving the Israeli–Palestinian conflict is not too complicated, stressing that equality and not revenge is the only viable path forward.

== Production ==
The film received support and grants from Women Make Movies, Jewish Film Institute, Jewish Story Partners, Catapult Film Fund, and the International Documentary Association.

== Awards and recognition ==
- Council of Europe, Human Rights in Motion Award (2025)
- Full Frame Documentary Film Festival, CDS Filmmaker Award (2025)
- IFDA Forum Award for Best Rough Cut (2023)
- New York Times Critic's Pick (2025)
- Sundance Film Festival, World Cinema Documentary Special Jury Award for Freedom of Expression (2025)
- Thessaloniki International Documentary Festival, Golden Alexander Award for Best Documentary (2025)
- Torino Film Festival, Special Jury Prize (2025)
