= The Speed Sisters =

Palestinian auto racing team

The Speed Sisters were an all-female, Palestinian automobile racing team that competed on the West Bank's professional car racing circuit.

== History ==
The team was formed in 2009 with support from the British Consulate in Jerusalem. Because the British Consulate funded a race car for them, the car flew both Palestinian and British flags.

Karen McLuskie, a British Consulate representative and head of the British effort to sponsor women's car racing in the Palestinian territories, predicted that 2011 would be the Speed Sisters’ year and more ladies would join the team.

The women competed in regular races against men, including the Speed Test, an annual race that began in 2005.

Team captain, Suna Aweidah, described the racing team as "a dream come true," although she acknowledged that her "family was not happy for me to start participating in this kind of sport." Team member Mona Ennab can boast that she was "the first girl to make the race here in Palestine." The head of the Palestinian Motorsport Federation, Khaled Khadoura, says that the women are serious competitors, and that he is "very proud to see our young women today taking an interest in race car driving, and training in order to improve themselves." One member was ranked among the top ten racers on the Palestinian circuit.

The team, which has already broken stereotypes in a male-dominated society, is breaking more by welcoming Sahar Jawabrah, its first member to wear the hijab, or Islamic head scarf. Safety-conscious, she covers the hijab with a helmet when racing. But women who drive race cars are not applauded in all quarters. With auto racing growing in popularity throughout the Muslim world, some Muslim clerics have condemned it for being frivolous and un-Islamic. Others call it haram, or forbidden according to Islamic law. One shopkeeper in Ramallah told a reporter that it is not an appropriate sport for Palestinian society, and that he, "would not allow my wife, my sister or my daughter to race."

In 2013, Anthony Bourdain took a ride with the Speed Sisters in his Emmy award-winning series Anthony Bourdain: Parts Unknown, which aired on CNN. It was the second episode of the second season, titled Jerusalem.

In 2015, the documentary film Speed Sisters was released, which details the exploits of the racing crew.
