= Amber Fares =

Canadian filmmaker

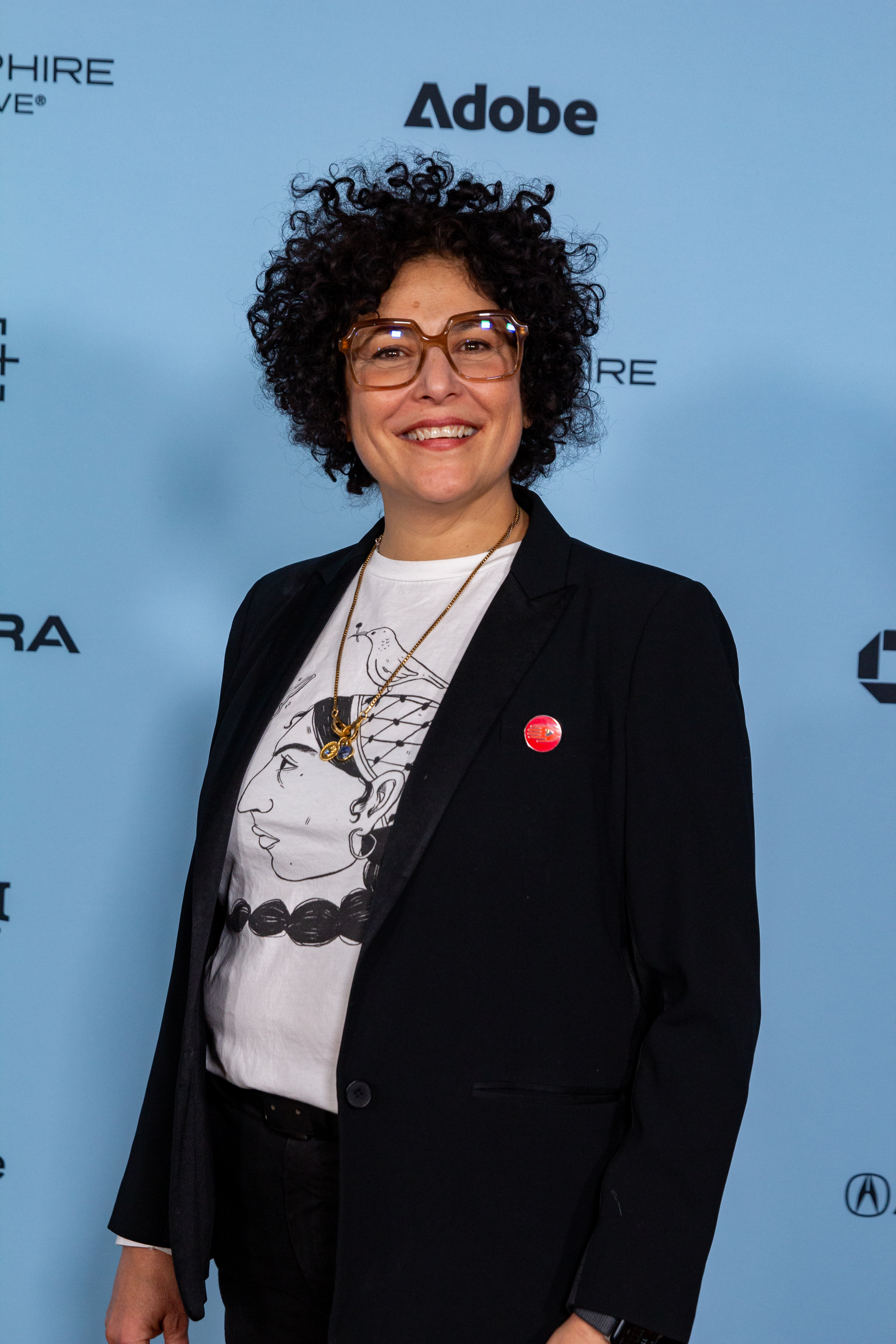
Fares in 2025

Amber Fares is a Lebanese Canadian filmmaker, documentarian, director and cinematographer. She co-founded SocDoc Studios. She is based in Brooklyn and the West Bank.

== Biography ==
Born in Canada with Lebanese roots, Fares began her secondary education at the University of Western Ontario from 1990 to 1993, graduating with a B.A. in Sociology. From 1997 to 2000, she attended the University of Calgary, receiving a M.B.A. in Marketing and International Business. After the September 11 attacks, she left her career in marketing to "deepen her understanding of life in the Middle East". In 2007, she enrolled in the film program at the Gulf Islands Film and Television School (GIFTS) located on Galiano Island. In 2009, Fares co-founded SocDoc Studios with Avi Goldstein.

Fares has also worked for the United Nations, Defence for Children International, and the British Consulate providing her videography expertise for projects such as Peace Starts Here, which is a video series for United Nations Relief and Works Agency for Palestine Refugees in the Near East (UNRWA) filmed in the West Bank, Gaza, Syria, Lebanon, and Jordan.

After Speed Sisters she went on to co-produce and was the cinematographer on the documentary The Judge, telling the story of Kholoud Al-Faqih of Ramallah, the first female sharia court judge in the Middle East. The film won a Peabody Award in 2019.

In 2021, Fares released Reckoning with Laughter, a 30-min documentary following Noam Shuster-Eliassi touring the USA as a comedian.

Her 2023 doc short We Are Ayenda, telling the story of the Afghan Girls National Football Team and how they fled Afghanistan after the Taliban seized power in 2021, won the Best Director at the Sundance Brand Storytelling conference 2024, as well as the Grand Prix for Entertainment at the 2024 Cannes Lions Festival of Creativity, AICP Award, and D&AD Award.

Her 2025 movie Coexistence, My Ass! gives an extraordinary perspective on one of the most brutal military conflicts of our time, the Israeli-Palestinian crisis. The feature won the Golden Alexander Award for Best Documentary at TIFF 2025. This award positions the film as a contender for the Academy Award for Best Documentary Feature Film. The film also won the World Cinema Documentary Special Jury Award for Freedom of Expression at Sundance 2025.

== Speed Sisters ==
Speed Sisters is Fares' first feature-length documentary, following the Speed Sisters: the first all-women race car driving team in the Arab World, made up of Noor Daoud, Marah Zahalqa, Maysoon Jayyusi, Mona Ennab, and Betty Saadeh. The film is based in the West Bank, where motor car racing has gained popularity. Some of the Speed Sisters and other subjects speak in English, while sections with Arabic speakers have English subtitles.

Speed Sisters tackles issues such as gender in Palestine, gender in racing, and Palestinian life under occupation. The film connects the women's literal mobility through racing to opportunities for Palestinian resistance to the occupation. In the trailer for the film, one of the Speed Sisters says, "How much will we let the occupation affect our lives? What are we supposed to do, stop living?" Fares depicts racing as relief from occupation and its restrictions and limitations of movement, mobility, and freedom.

On December 1, 2014, Speed Sisters debuted as the opening film of the Doha Film Institute's Ajyal Youth Film Festival. The Huffington Post's E. Nina Rothe reported on the event, calling the film "cool, fast-paced, insightful and fun to watch" with an "infectious soundtrack" including music by Swedish Palestinian musician Hanouneh. Rothe continues, saying that Fares depicts "a West Bank that while surrounded by conflicts and occupations is a fully functioning, passionate world, filled with exceptional human beings. A Palestine of loving fathers, stubborn daughters.... A Palestine that is livable, not just survivable, away from the headlines and wars."

== Filmography ==
=== Documentaries ===
- Convergence: Courage in a Crisis (co-director, 2021);
- We Are Ayenda (2023).

=== Short films ===
- Ghetto Town (2009)
- Reckoning with Laughter (2021)

=== Feature length ===
- Speed Sisters (2015)
- The Judge (2017)
- Coexistence, My Ass! (2025)
