= A. M. Qattan Foundation =

Palestinian organization

- مؤسسة عبد المحسن القطان
- Founded: 1993; 33 years ago
- Founder: Abdel Mohsin Al-Qattan
- Location: Ramallah, Palestine
- Website: qattanfoundation.org/en

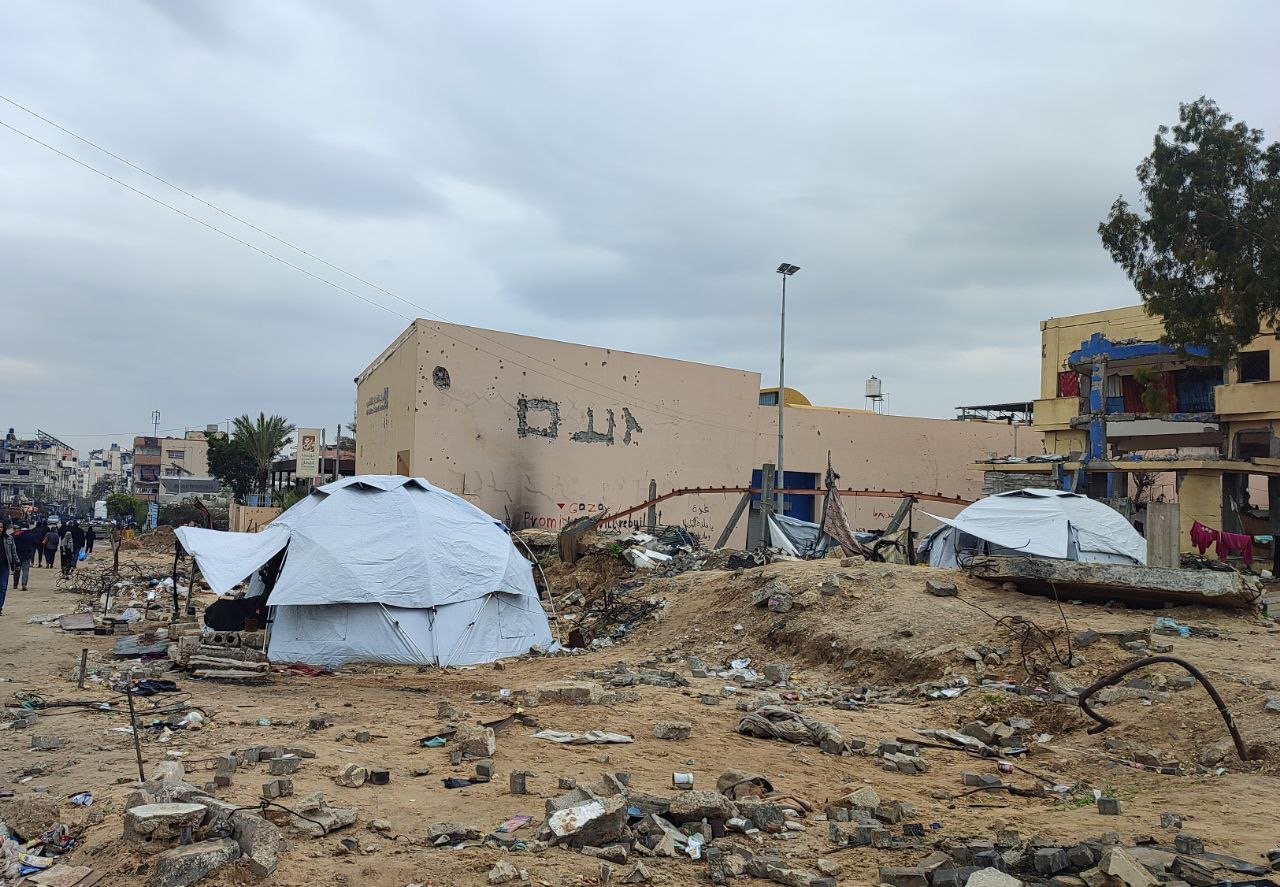
The Foundation's building in Khan Yunis

The A. M. Qattan Foundation (Arabic: مؤسسة عبد المحسن القطان, romanized: Muʔassasa ʕAbd al-Muḥsin al-Qaṭṭān) is a Palestinian not-for-profit developmental organisation based in Ramallah.

It was founded in 1993 by the Palestinian businessman and politician Abdel Mohsin Al-Qattan. The chairman is his son Omar Al-Qattan.

In June 2018, the Foundation opened a $21 million headquarters building and arts centre in Ramallah.

The foundation was involved in a bid to add Palestinian hikaye to UNESCO's list of intangible cultural heritage.
