= International Women's Film Festival in Rehovot =

Women's film festival in Israel, 2004–2014

International Women's Film Festival In Rehovot הפסטיבל הבינלאומי לסרטי נשים רחובות
- Location: Rehovot, Israel
- Established: 2004
- Awards: Best Feature; Best Short; Best Documentary; Most Promising Filmmaker
- Hosted by: Women in the Picture Association; Municipality of Rehovot
- Language: Hebrew, English
- Website: www.iwff.net

International Women's Film Festival In Rehovot (Hebrew: הפסטיבל הבינלאומי לסרטי נשים רחובות) is a film festival that occurred from 2004 to 2014 in the city of Rehovot, Israel. The purpose of the festival was to promote films made by women.

== Background ==
The festival was organized by the Women in the Picture Association with support from the Municipality of Rehovot.

The festival was intended as a platform for women filmmakers from Israel and abroad to create direct connections between creators, and an opportunity for audiences to see different types of films. The festival also included workshops, panels, lectures, and additional events.

Four competitions were held in the festival: Best Feature (until 2011 there were three; that year, the Narrative Film award was split into Feature and Short) Best Short Fiction Film, Best Documentary, and Most Promising Filmmaker. In addition, a grant was awarded annually for the development of a full-length feature film, sponsored by the Yehoshua Rabinowitz Foundation for the Arts in Tel Aviv.

In 2014, Rehovot Municipality decided to stop budgeting the festival.

== History ==
Year	Information	Category	Winner
2013 #10	October 21–27; more than 60 films were screened.	Feature	Alice Winocour, Augustine
2013 #10	October 21–27; more than 60 films were screened.	Short	Mizmor Weizman, Small Story
2013 #10	October 21–27; more than 60 films were screened.	Documentary	Yael Kiper and Ronen Zaretzky, Superwomen
2013 #10	October 21–27; more than 60 films were screened.	Most Promising	Tal Shefi, Not Your Life
2012 #9	November 5–11; more than 60 film were screened, 33 by Israeli filmmakers. Theme: Women and religion.	Feature	Ann Hui, A Simple Life
2012 #9	November 5–11; more than 60 film were screened, 33 by Israeli filmmakers. Theme: Women and religion.	Short	Ronnie Sasson Angel, Wherever You Go
2012 #9	November 5–11; more than 60 film were screened, 33 by Israeli filmmakers. Theme: Women and religion.	Documentary	Rachel Leah Jones, Gypsy Davy
2012 #9	November 5–11; more than 60 film were screened, 33 by Israeli filmmakers. Theme: Women and religion.	Most Promising	Orit Fuchs, Krav Einayim
2011 #8	November 7–13; more than 60 films screened, 35 by Israeli filmmakers. Themes: Violence against women, Women and the revolution.	Feature	Veronica Kedar, Joe + Belle
2011 #8	November 7–13; more than 60 films screened, 35 by Israeli filmmakers. Themes: Violence against women, Women and the revolution.	Short	Mor Yogev, Thicker Than Water
2011 #8	November 7–13; more than 60 films screened, 35 by Israeli filmmakers. Themes: Violence against women, Women and the revolution.	Documentary	Efrat Shalom-Danon, The Dreamers
2011 #8	November 7–13; more than 60 films screened, 35 by Israeli filmmakers. Themes: Violence against women, Women and the revolution.	Most Promising	Maayan Rif, Martha Must Fly
2010 #7	September 1–7; more than 50 films, 24 by Israeli filmmakers. Theme: Women in areas of ongoing conflict.	Narrative	Elite Zexer, Tasnim
2010 #7	September 1–7; more than 50 films, 24 by Israeli filmmakers. Theme: Women in areas of ongoing conflict.	Documentary	Noa Ben Hagai, Blood Relations
2010 #7	September 1–7; more than 50 films, 24 by Israeli filmmakers. Theme: Women in areas of ongoing conflict.	Most Promising	Hadar Agayev, Finger in the Water
2009 #6	September 7–13; more than 50 films, 25 by Israeli filmmakers. Theme: Influence of money on women's lives.	Narrative	Noa Arenberg, December 25
2009 #6	September 7–13; more than 50 films, 25 by Israeli filmmakers. Theme: Influence of money on women's lives.	Documentary	Israela Shaer Meoded, Hamalka Hantarisha
2009 #6	September 7–13; more than 50 films, 25 by Israeli filmmakers. Theme: Influence of money on women's lives.	Most Promising	Dana Goldberg, Alligator
2008 #5	September 15–21; more than 60 films, 26 by Israeli filmmakers. Theme: Women and food in cinema.	Narrative	Tali Shalom Ezer, Surrogate
2008 #5	September 15–21; more than 60 films, 26 by Israeli filmmakers. Theme: Women and food in cinema.	Documentary	Ada Ushpiz, Desert Brides
2008 #5	September 15–21; more than 60 films, 26 by Israeli filmmakers. Theme: Women and food in cinema.	Most Promising	Hadar Morag, Silence
2007 #4	September 5–9; more than 60 films, 26 by Israeli filmmakers.	Narrative	Osnat Wald, Moment Ella Shrier, Stain (tie)
2007 #4	September 5–9; more than 60 films, 26 by Israeli filmmakers.	Documentary	Hadar Bashan, In Freiman's Kitchen Hannah Zelis, The Unkosher Truth (tie)
2007 #4	September 5–9; more than 60 films, 26 by Israeli filmmakers.	Most Promising	Hagar Ben Asher, Paths
2006 #3			
2005 #2			
2004 #1	September 10–11; 50 films. The debut edition of the festival screened to sold-out crowds.	Narrative	Ilil Alexander, Et SheAhava Nafshi
2004 #1	September 10–11; 50 films. The debut edition of the festival screened to sold-out crowds.	Documentary	Ibtisam Mara'ana, Paradise Lost
2004 #1	September 10–11; 50 films. The debut edition of the festival screened to sold-out crowds.	Most Promising	Pazit Ben Hayil and Galit Shaked Shaul, Halutzot

== See also ==
- International Women's Film Festival (disambiguation)
- List of women's film festivals
