= Noam Shuster-Eliassi =

Israeli comedian

- נועם שוסטר אליאסי
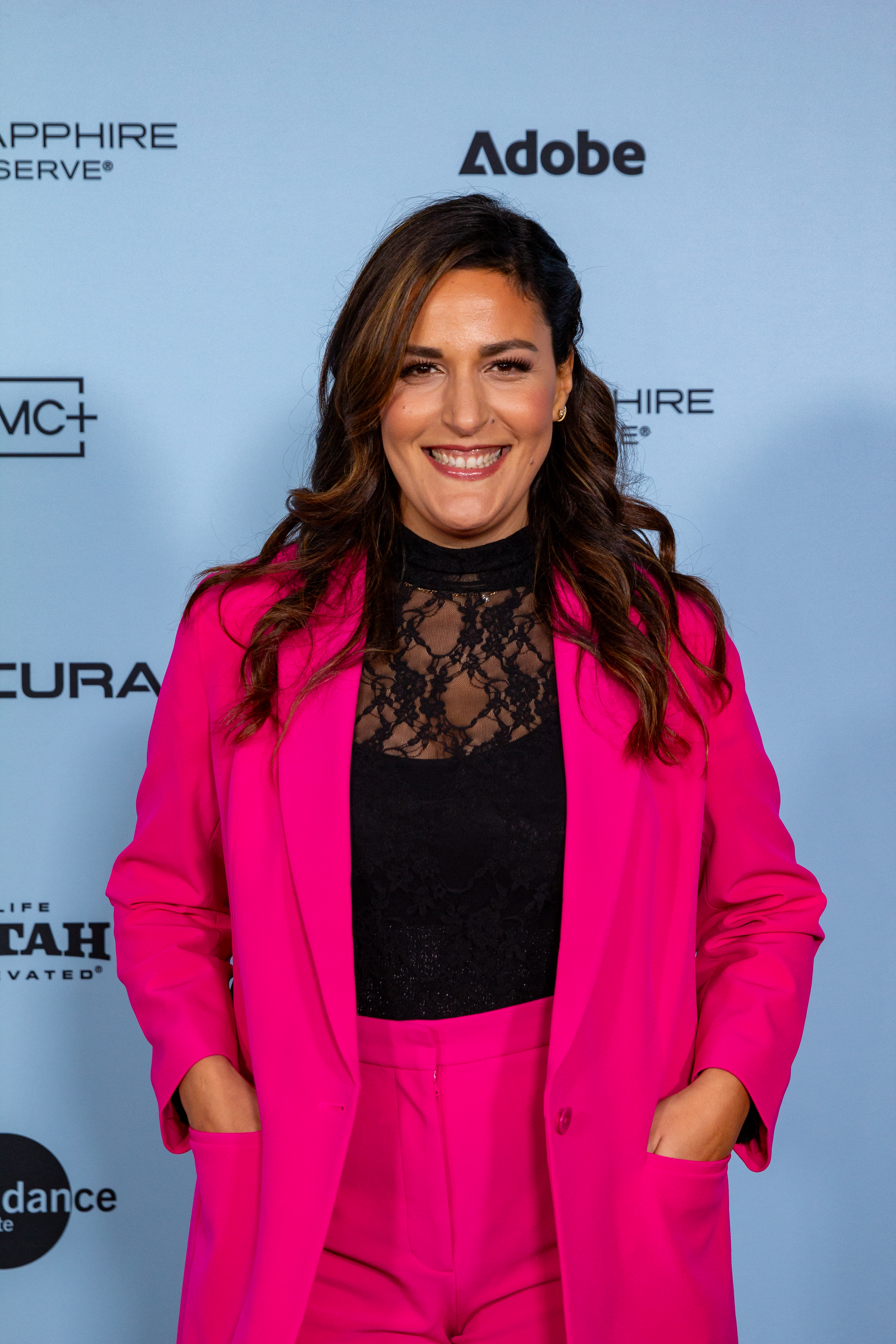
- Shuster-Eliassi in 2025
- Born: 1986 or 1987 (age 38–39)
- Education: Brandeis University (2011); Harvard University (fellowship at the Harvard Divinity School)
- Website: www.noamlive.com

Noam Shuster-Eliassi (Hebrew: נועם שוסטר אליאסי; born 1986 or 1987), is an Israeli comedian and activist. She performs in Hebrew, Arabic, and English.

== Biography ==
Shuster-Eliassi was born to an Iranian-born Jewish mother and a Jerusalem-born father whose parents were Holocaust survivors from Romania. From the age of seven years, she was raised in Neve Shalom/Wāħat as-Salām ("Oasis of Peace"), a community north of Jerusalem where Jews and Palestinians live together by choice. Therein, she learned Arabic quickly and was often mistaken for an Arab.

Shuster-Eliassi performed national service instead of serving in the IDF, then attended New York Film Academy for a year. She played a part in Talya Lavie's 2006 short film "The Substitute" before attending Brandeis University on a scholarship, graduating in 2011. Through an internship with Women's Equity in Access to Care & Treatment (WE ACT), she went to Rwanda to help women obtain medical treatment.

When she was in her early twenties, Shuster-Eliassi became a co-director of Interpeace, an organization founded by the United Nations. She worked on a project in Israel that aimed to involve groups that had been excluded, or had excluded themselves, from conversations about a peaceful future with Palestinians. Her outreach included ultra-Orthodox Jews, Russian-speaking Israelis, Palestinian Israelis, and even those strongly opposed to a Palestinian state, such as religious Zionists and settlers. After directing the program by Interpeace in Israel for five years, the program was shut down in 2017 due to "political concerns". Looking for another position, she applied to become a member of the Jewish engagement and social change leadership program ROI Community, and delivered a stand-up comedy routine at an ROI Summit talent show in Jerusalem, where she realized that she needed to perform comedy as part of her activism.

In 2019, she attended Harvard Divinity School as a fellow under the Religion, Conflict, and Peace Initiative, where she was to develop her one-woman show to be performed at various venues in major US cities. However, with the outbreak of the COVID-19 pandemic, she returned to Israel, where she contracted the virus and stayed at a "coronavirus hostel" in Jerusalem until testing negative.

She was the subject of the mini documentary Reckoning with Laughter, directed by Amber Fares and produced by Al Jazeera. The film was released in 2021. Their further collaboration resulted in the 2025 feature documentary Coexistence, My Ass!, directed by Fares. In Coexistence, My Ass! Fares follows Shuster-Eliassi's path from a diplomat to stand-up comedian. The movie won several awards, including the Golden Alexander Award for Best Documentary at TDF 2025, and the World Cinema Documentary Special Jury Award for Freedom of Expression at Sundance 2025.

=== "Dubai, Dubai" ===
Shuster-Eliassi had a viral moment in Arab media January 2022 in response to her performance of a satirical song called "Dubai, Dubai" in Arabic on the program "Shu Esmo" (שו־אסמו, الشوسمو) on the Arabic Israeli station Makan 33. Performing as "Haifa Wannabe" (playing on the name of the Arab pop star Haifa Wehbe), she delivered searing punchlines satirizing the Abraham Accords and the Emirates' normalization of relations with Israel and mocking the hypocrisy of Israel's relations with Arab countries. The song was written by the program's editor, Razi Najjar.

== Awards ==
In 2018, Shuster-Eliassi was named "Best New Jewish Comedian of the Year" in a competition sponsored by JW3, also known as Jewish Community Centre in London.
