= Human Rights Watch Film Festival =

- Founded: 1989
- Disestablished: 2024
- Film titles: 479
- Directors: John Biaggi; Jennifer Nedbalsky
- Producers: Leah Sapin; Frances Underhill
- Website: https://ff.hrw.org/

Human Rights Watch Film Festival is an annual film festival held by Human Rights Watch organization in more than 20 countries which previews human rights films and videos in commercial and archival theaters and on public and cable television. This film festival was established in 1988, in part to mark the 10th anniversary of the founding of Human Rights Watch. After 3 years, it was resumed in 1991 and was presented annually until it ceased operations in 2024.

== Editions ==
Editions of the festival are currently held in Amsterdam, Geneva, London, Los Angeles, Miami, New York City, San Diego, Oslo, Toronto and the San Francisco Bay Area.

=== 2024 ===
20 films were selected for 2024.

=== 2023 ===
20 films were selected for 2023. "Into My Name" by Nicolò Bassetti won the Jury Prize for Best Documentary in the New York selection.

=== 2022 ===
20 films were selected for 2022.

=== 2021 ===
27 films were selected for 2021.

=== 2020 ===
23 films were selected for 2020.

=== 2019 ===
38 films were selected for 2019.

=== 2018 ===
45 films were selected for 2018.

=== 2017 ===
42 films were selected for 2017.

=== 2016 ===
47 films were selected for 2016.

=== 2015 ===
33 films were selected for 2015.

=== 2014 ===
22 films were selected for 2014.

=== 2013 ===
30 films were selected for 2013.

=== 2012 ===
27 films were selected for 2012.

=== 2011 ===
35 films were selected for 2011.

=== 2010 ===
20 films were selected for 2010.

Title	Selections
12th & Delaware	New York
Back Home Tomorrow	New York
Backyard	New York
Budrus	London
Enemies of the People	London, New York
Honeymoons	London, New York
In the Land of the Free…	London, New York
Iran: Voices of the Unheard	London, New York, San Diego
Last Train Home	London, New York
Moloch Tropical	London, New York
Nero's Guests	London, New York
No One Knows About Persian Cats	London
Restrepo	New York
The Balibo Conspiracy	New York
The Greatest Silence: Rape in the Congo	New York
The Red Chapel	London
The Sun Behind the Clouds: Tibet's Struggle for Freedom	London
The Unreturned	New York
Under Rich Earth	New York
Welcome	London, New York

=== 2009 ===
25 films were selected for 2009.

Title	Region	Selections
Born Into Brothels	Asia	New York
Burma VJ - Reporting from a Closed Country	Asia	London, New York
Crude		London, New York
Eden is West	Europe	London, New York
Endgame		London"
Firaaq		New York
Ford Transit	Middle East	New York
Good Fortune	Africa	London, New York
In the Holy Fire of Revolution	Europe	London, New York
Iraq in Fragments	Middle East	New York
Jung: In the Land of the Mujaheddin	Asia	New York
Kabuli Kid	Asia	New York
Laila's Birthday	Middle East	London, New York
Look Into My Eyes	Europe	London, New York
Mrs. Goundo's Daughter	Africa	London, New York
My Neighbor, My Killer	Africa	London, New York
Pray the Devil Back to Hell	Africa	London, New York"
Project Kashmir	Asia	London, New York"
Regret to Inform	United States	New York"
Remnants of a War	Middle East	London, New York
Snow	Europe	London, New York
Tapologo	Africa	London, New York
The Age of Stupid		London, New York
The Reckoning: The Battle for the International Criminal Court		London, New York
The Yes Men Fix the World		New York

=== 2007 ===
Title	Region	Selections
Mon Colonel	United States	New York
Banished	United States	New York
Carla’s List	United States	New York
The City of Photographers	United States	New York
Cocalero	United States	New York
The Devil Came on Horseback	United States	New York
Election Day	United States	New York
Enemies of Happiness	United States	New York
Sari’s Mother	United States	New York
Everything’s Cool	United States	New York
Hot House	United States	New York
A Lesson of Belarusian	United States	New York
ACLU Pizza Surveillance Feature	United States	New York
Virtual Freedom	United States	New York
Lumo	United States	New York
Manufactured Landscapes	United States	New York
New Visions	United States	New York
The Railroad All-Stars	United States	New York
Strange Culture	United States	New York
Suffering and Smiling	United States	New York
The Unforeseen	United States	New York
The Violin	United States	New York
We’ll Never Meet Childhood Again	United States	New York
White Light/Black Rain	United States	New York
On the Frontlines	United States	New York

=== 2006 ===
- "Iraq in Fragments" by James Longley won the Nestor Almendros Award in the New York selection.

=== 2001 ===
- "Jung (War) in the Land of the Mujaheddin" by Fabrizio Lazzaretti, Alberto Vendemmiati, and Giuseppe Petitto won the Nestor Almendros Award in the New York selection, and Raoul Peck won the Lifetime Achievement Award.

=== 2000 ===
- "A Civilized People" by Randa Chahal Sabag won the Nestor Almendros Award in the New York selection, and Frederick Wiseman won the Lifetime Achievement Award.

=== 1999 ===
- "La Ciudad (The City)" by David Riker and "Regret to Inform" by Barbara Sonneborn tied to win the Nestor Almendros Award in the New York selection.

=== 1998 ===
- "An Ordinary President" by Yuriy Khashchevatskiy won the Nestor Almendros Award in the New York selection, and Barbara Kopple won the Lifetime Achievement Award.

=== 1997 ===
- "Flame" by Ingrid Sinclair won the Nestor Almendros Award in the New York selection, and Alan J. Pakula won the Lifetime Achievement Award.

=== 1996 ===
- "Calling the Ghosts: A Story About Rape, War and Women" by Mandy Jacobson and Karmen Jelincic won the Nestor Almendros Award in the New York selection, and Ousmane Sembène won the Lifetime Achievement Award.

=== 1995 ===
- Costa-Gavras won the Lifetime Achievement Award in the New York selection

=== 1992 ===
- "L'ombre du chasseur" by Georgi Balabanov won Best Documentary Film in the New York selection

== See also ==
- International Film Festival and Forum on Human Rights
