= San Francisco Jewish Film Festival =

Oldest Jewish film festival in the world

- Location: San Francisco, Berkeley, Oakland, San Rafael, and Palo Alto, California
- Founded: 1980
- Website: jfi.org

San Francisco Jewish Film Festival is the oldest Jewish film festival in the world. Established in 1981, it typically attracts an audience of over 40,000 and includes screenings in San Francisco, Berkeley, Oakland, San Rafael and Palo Alto. The three-week summer festival is held in San Francisco, California, usually at the Castro Theatre in San Francisco and at other cinemas in the other locations. It features contemporary and classic independent Jewish film from around the world. The festival also maintains an online archive of Jewish film, and holds individual film screenings throughout the year.

In 2015, the organization re-branded itself as the Jewish Film Institute, retaining the name "San Francisco Jewish Film Festival" for the annual film festival. The Jewish Film Institute is home to grants and residencies such as the JFI Completion Grant and JFI Filmmaker Residency for documentary filmmakers.

The current executive director is Lexi Leban and the program director is Jay Rosenblatt.

== History ==
The festival was founded by Deborah Kaufman in 1980, Kaufman told The New York Times in a later interview that: "I wanted to express my Jewishness and my progressive politics and my cultural hipness at the same time. There was no venue like that at the time, so I had to invent one." Kaufman was able to draw a wide-ranging audience to include: "gay men, lesbians, vegetarian holistic Hasidics, Holocaust survivors, atheist Jews, leftists and scholars, among others." The festival was first held at the Roxie Theater in San Francisco in 1981.

In 1990, an offshoot of the festival was established in Moscow. Kaufman and fellow festival director, Janis Plotkin, presented a week of films at the festival, the largest Jewish cultural event in the history of the Soviet Union. The festival faced issues with Moscow city official refusing to rent out movie theaters for the festival, citing fear of demonstrations from ultra-right nationalists. Kaufman and Plotkin, who had raised $225,000 for the festival appealed to senators Alan Cranston, Pete Wilson and Ron Dellums, Member of the U.S. House of Representatives, to resolve the crisis. The festival was ultimately housed at four large movie theatres in the city. The festival included screenings of Louis Malle's Au Revoir Les Enfants, Paul Mazursky's Enemies, A Love Story (based on the novel of the same name by Isaac Bashevis Singer, Joan Micklin Silver's Crossing Delancey,. The documentary, Isaac in America: A Journey with Isaac Bashevis Singer, was also shown.

In 1992, the festival team produced a Jewish film festival in Madrid in Spain to commemorate 500 years since the Spanish Inquisition and Jewish expulsion. The team sought to underline Jewish-Arab cooperation during the medieval period in Spain and to highlight the marginalized cultures of Sephardic and Mizrahi jews. The festival attracted sold-out crowds, with audiences mostly consisting of students in their 20s and 30s.

In 1997, the festival edited and published Independent Jewish Film: A Resource Guide, a 172-page volume. It included plot summaries for more than 400 Jewish films, detailed instructions on setting up a Jewish film festival, an account of the earlier 1990 Jewish film festival in Moscow, as well articles on Israeli cinema and Jewish cinema in the United States.

In 2009, the festival was subject to criticism for the decision to screen a film about International Solidarity Movement activist Rachel Corrie who was killed by an Israeli armoured bulldozer in Gaza in 2003 while protesting the demolition of Palestinian homes. Writing in the N. California JWeekly, Dan Pine noted "If the Academy handed out an Oscar for community turmoil, the Rachel Corrie flap at this year’s San Francisco Jewish Film Festival would win handily." Pine reported that some Jewish community members said that festival organizers "crossed a line into overtly anti-Israel propaganda" and that "Corrie, and now her parents, have worked to ostracize and delegitimize Israel." In a statement, festival Executive Director Peter Stein apologized "for not fully considering how upsetting this program might be." At the same time, the festival did not back down from its decision to screen the film. In 2011, the festival revisited the controversy with a screening of the documentary Between Two Worlds. The documentary, directed by the festival's founder, Deborah Kaufman explores the controversy and poses questions about Jewish identity.
