= Docaviv =

Annual international documentary film festival held in Tel Aviv, Israel

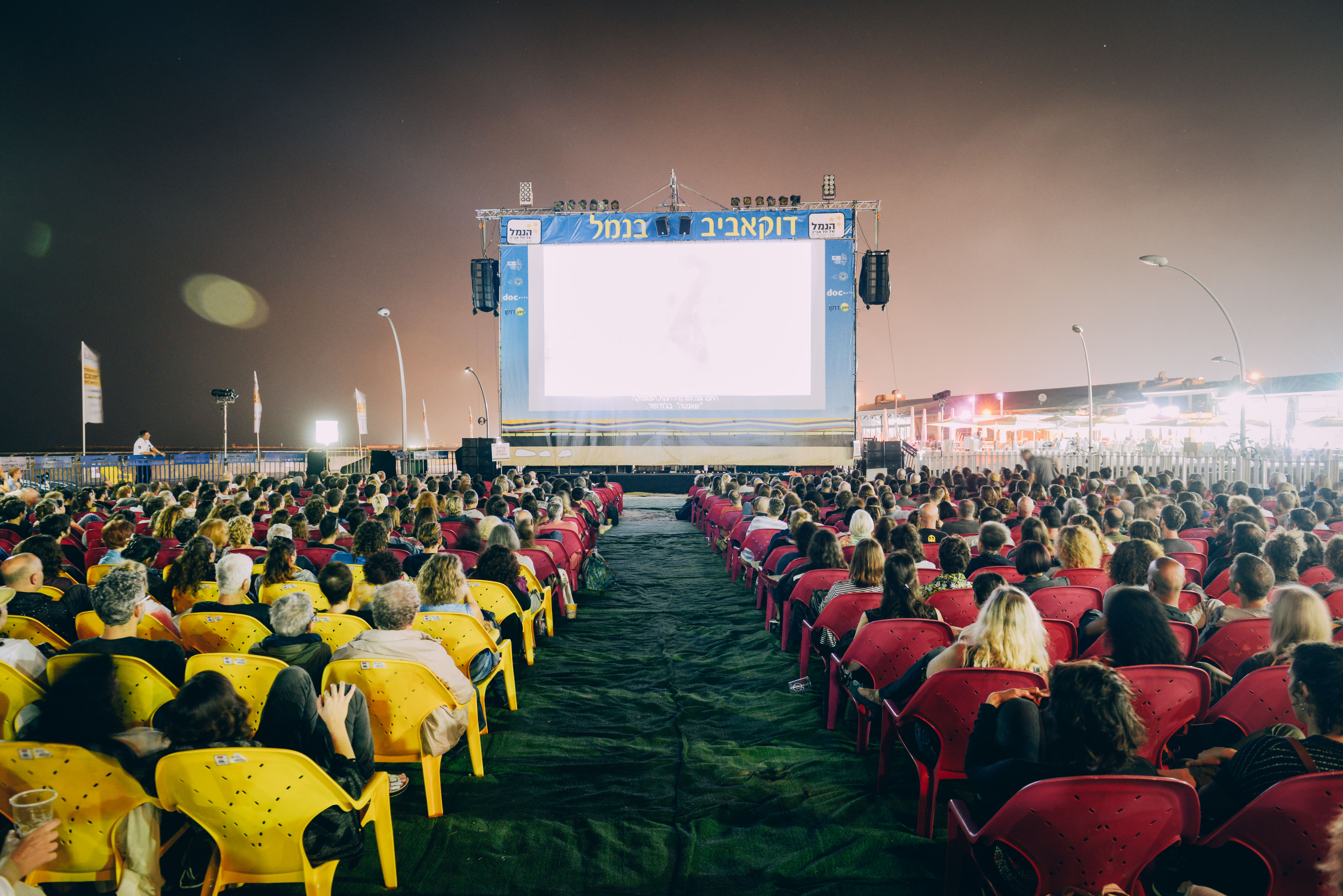
Outdoor screening in Docaviv, 2016

Docaviv (Hebrew: דוקאביב), also known as the Tel Aviv International Documentary Film Festival, is the only film festival in Israel dedicated to documentary films, and the largest film festival in Tel Aviv. It is run by a non-profit organisation of the same name, founded in 1998. In recent years (to 2021) the festival has drawn an attendance of around 40,000.

The festival has multiple sections, including a domestic Israeli Competition, an International Competition, and the non-competitive Panorama, Masters and Music sections.

Docaviv Galilee is a five-day offshoot of the festival, held at Ma'alot-Tarshiha.

== Funding and selection process ==
Docaviv is funded by the Israeli government, as well as by private entities and companies. In 2019, the festival's artistic director, Karin Rywkind Segal, stated that the festival operates independently in selecting films, and that, "So far, no one has requested that we change anything. We are not a political film festival, but we are against censorship, and we are for freedom of speech and democracy. And we can be very diverse. If there is a movie that is not in alignment with our political views but gets people to ask questions, or even if it's one-sided in its outlook, but is open to debate and thought, we will screen it if it's a good piece of cinema."

Each year, Docaviv staff meet with funding bodies for documentaries, as well as with broadcasters, in order to be cognizant of upcoming documentary films and ask their filmmakers to submit their works to the festival. Submissions to Docaviv's Israeli Competition are submitted through an open call process each September. Around 80 documentaries are submitted to Docaviv's Israeli Competition annually. The members of the selection committee for the Israeli Competition change each year.
