= International Women's Film Festival =

International Women's Film Festival may refer to:

- Aswan International Women’s Film Festival, Egypt
- Barcelona International Women's Film Festival, Spain
- Beirut International Women Film Festival, Lebanon
- Cairo International Women's Film Festival, Egypt
- International Women's Film Festival (Australia), a 1975 film festival in multiple capital cities
- International Women's Film Festival (France), formerly Créteil International Women's Film Festival
- International Women's Film Festival in Salé, Morocco
- International Women's Film Festival in Rehovot, Israel
- Mumbai Women's International Film Festival, India
- Seoul International Women's Film Festival, Korea
- St. John’s International Women’s Film Festival, Canada

== See also ==
- List of women's film festivals
- Women's film festival
