= List of women's film festivals =

List of international film festivals focusing on women

Women's film festivals are film events geared to promote women in the film industry. Women’s film festivals began due to the lack of female voice within the film industry. To combat this hindrance, their own film festival was designed. Most women's film festivals only screen films directed, produced, or written by women. Some film festivals only invite women to attend. Sometimes, some events or awards are also geared towards men, if their work promotes women's career paths or visibility in the industry.

== List ==
Name	Est.	City	Country	Type	Notes	Website
Erstes Internationales Frauenfilm-Seminar	1973	Berlin	Germany	International	Seminar on women's films and working conditions for women working in film	https://www.arsenal-berlin.de/assets/Kino/PDFs/1973_Broschuere_Frauenfilmseminar.pdf
Aichi International Women’s Film Festival	1996	Aichi	Japan	International		aiwff.com
Another Experiment by Women Film Festival	2010	New York	United States	Special interest	Women's experimental films, featuring under-represented themes and issues	axwonline.com
Archer Film Festival	2012	Los Angeles	United States	Special interest	High school film festival, not exclusive to women filmmakers	archerfilmfestival.org
Artemis Women In Action Film and music Festival	2015/19/20	Los Angeles	United States	International	Dedicated to honouring female action and empowerment heroes.	www.artemisfilmfestival.com/mission/
Aswan International Women's Film Festival	2017	Aswan	Egypt	International		aiwff.org
Athena Film Festival	2009	New York	United States	International	Barnard College event focusing on "fearless women leaders"	athenafilmfestival.com
Ax Wound Film Festival		Brattleboro	United States	Special interest	Horror films made by women	filmfreeway.com/AxWoundFilmFestival
Barcelona International Women's Film Festival	1992	Barcelona	Spain	International		mostrafilmsdones.cat
Beirut International Women Film Festival	2016	Beirut	Lebanon	International	Organized by Beirut Film Society, under the theme “Women for Change”	beirutwomenfilmfestival.com
Bentonville Film Festival	2015	Bentonville	United States	International	Partner of Geena Davis Institute on Gender in Media	bentonvillefilmfestival.com
Berlin Feminist Film Week		Berlin	Germany	International	Feminist films	berlinfeministfilmweek.com
Berlin Lesbian Film Festival		Berlin	Germany	International	Films of lesbian interest; on hiatus	lesbenfilmfestival.de
Birds-Eye View Film Festival	2002	London	United Kingdom	International	Since 2014, various year-round events around the UK (formerly annual)	birds-eye-view.co.uk
Bordeaux International Festival of Women in Cinema	1999	Arcachon, then Bordeaux	France	International	Defunct; final edition 2005	
Boston Women's Film Festival	2018	Boston	United States	International		bostonwomensfest.org
Breakthroughs Film Festival	2011	Toronto	Canada	International	Short films of all genres	breakthroughsfilmfestival.com
Brooklyn Girl Film Festival	2012	Brooklyn	United States	International	Disbanded in 2015	
Brooklyn Women's Film Festival	2017	Brooklyn	United States	International		brooklynwomensfilmfestival.com
Broad Humor	2015	Venice, California	United States	International	Focus on comic films by women	broadhumor.com
Cairo International Women's Film Festival	2008	Cairo	Egypt	International		cairowomenfilmfest.com
California Women’s Film Festival		Los Angeles	United States	International		calwomensfest.com
CASCADIA International Women’s Film Festival	2017	Bellingham, Washington	United States	International		cascadiafilmfest.org
China Women's Film Festival	2013	Beijing	China	International		chinawomensff.net
Citizen Jane Film Festival	2008	Columbia, Missouri	United States	International	Cancelled from 2019	
Corto Helvetico al Femminile		Muralto	Switzerland	International	Women's International Short Film Festival	festival-chf.ch
Coven Film Festival	2019	San Francisco, California	United States	International	Films by women and non-binary filmmakers from San Francisco Bay and around the world	covenfilmfestival.com
Crucial 21st Century Cinema #DirectedbyWomen	2015	Online		International	Work by women directors premiering during the 21st century	directedbywomen.com
Davis Feminist Film Festival	2006	UC Davis	United States	International	Grassroots festival of short films from around the world	davis-feminist-film-festival
Detroit SheTown Film Festival	2018	Detroit	United States	International	Short films by or about women	detroitshetownfilmfestival.com
Dublin Feminist Film Festival	2014	Dublin	Ireland	International		dublinfeministfilmfestival.com
Elles Tournent – Dames Draaien Festival	2009	Brussels	Belgium	International		ellestournent.be
Etheria Film Night	2014	Los Angeles	United States	Special interest	Horror, sci-fi, thriller, dark comedy short films	etheriafilmnight.com
Eve Film Festival	2018	Ottawa	Canada	International	Showcases and supports work by women (including cis and trans) and genderqueer directors	evefilmfestival.ca
Everett Film Festival	1997	Everett	United States	International		everettfilmfestival.org
Female Eye Film Festival	2001	Toronto	Canada	International		femaleeyefilmfestival.com
FemCine	2010	Santiago	Chile	International	Includes some films by men	femcine.cl
Fem Film Festival	2019	Bangkok	Thailand	International	Focus on Southeast Asian films. Presented by Bangkok Screening Room	bkksr.com/movies/fem-film-festival-2019
Femina Fest	2004	Rio de Janeiro	Brazil	International	On hold	feminafest.com (archived 2014)
Feminist & Queer International Film Festival	2015	Bucharest	Romania	International	Disbanded	faqiff.ro/
Festival Filministes	2015	Montreal	Canada	International	Organizes screenings of cinematographic works followed by discussions on various contemporary feminist issues	festivalfilministes.com
Festival Cine por Mujeres Madrid / Films by Women Madrid	2018	Madrid	Spain	International	All kind of feature films made by women	festivalcinepormujeres.com
Films, Femmes, Mediterranée	2005	Marseille	France	International	Focusing on filmmakers and actresses from Mediterranean countries	films-femmes-med.org
Film Festival Assen	1980	Assen	Netherlands	International	Films focusing on women in front of and behind the camera	filmfestivalassen.nl
Film Festival for Women's Rights	2006	Seoul	South Korea	International	Focusing on subjects relating to violence against women	fiwom.org
Filmmor Women's Film Festival on Wheels	2003	Istanbul, Bodrum	Turkey	International		filmmor.org
Flying Broom International Women's Film Festival	1997	Ankara	Turkey	International		ucansupurge.org.tr
For Film's Sake (formerly the WOW Film Festival)	1996	Sydney	Australia	International	Paused since 2019	For Film's Sake
FrauenFilmTage	2004	Vienna	Austria	International		frauenfilmtage.at
Freiburger Lesben Filmtage	1990	Freiburg	Germany	International	Lesbian interest films	freiburger-lesbenfilmtage.de
F-Sides	2020	Bucharest	Romania	Special interest	Cineclub and festival dedicated to women creators	f-sides.ro/
Fusion Film Festival	2003	New York	United States	International	NYU festival	fusionfilmfestival.com
hecho x mujeres	2008	Rosario, Santa Fe	Argentina	International	Disbanded in 2014	festivalhechoxmujeres.blogspot.com/
HER Docs Film Festival	2019	Warsaw	Poland	International	Documentary films, animations, experimental films, and video artworks directed by women	herdocs.pl
Her International Film Festival	2020	Killarney, County Kerry	Ireland	International		filmfreeway.com/YoungWomenInFilm
Herat International Women's Film Festival (HIWFF)	2013	Herat	Afghanistan	International	Films about women and/or executed by women, human rights, gender equality, sexual identity, etc. Last held Nov. 2020?	hiwff.com; IWFF on Facebook
High Falls Film Festival	2001	Rochester	United States	International		highfallsfilmfestival.com/2018/
Hollywood Women's Film Festival	2019	Hollywood	United States	International	Hosted by Hollywood Women's Film Institute; women filmmakers	hollywoodwomensfilminstitute.org
IAWRT Asian Women's Film Festival	2005	New Delhi	India	International	Films directed by Asian women	iawrt.org
Ifema	2006	Malmö	Sweden	International	Screens films by women directors	femalefilmfestival.se
Imagine This Women's International Film Festival	2016	Brooklyn	United States	International		imaginethiswomensfilmfestival.org
International Black Women's Film Festival	2001	San Francisco	United States	International	Media by and/or about Black women from around the world	
International Festival of Women's Films	1972	New York	United States	International	First major women's film festival; defunct since 1976	
International Images Film Festival for Women	2002	Harare	Zimbabwe	International	Films by and about women, mostly by women filmmakers from all over the world	capatrust.orgl
International Women's Film Festival	1975	Australian capital cities	Australia	International	One-off	
International Women's Film Festival	1978	Créteil	France	International	Formerly Créteil International Women's Film Festival	filmsdefemmes.com
International Women's Film Festival In Rehovot	2004	Rehovot	Israel	International	Disbanded in 2014	
International Women's Film Festival in Salé (FIFFS)	2005	Salé	Morocco	International		fiffs.ma
Internationales Frauen* Film Fest Dortmund+Köln (from Feminale)	1984	Cologne	Germany	International	Formerly Feminale (founded 1984) and femme totale festivals; merged 2006. Germany's oldest feminist film festival	frauenfilmfest.com/en/
Io Isabella International Film Week	2005	Valsinni	Italy	International	Disbanded in 2007	
Journées de la femme africaine de l'image	2014	Ouagadougou & Banfora	Burkina Faso	International	Featuring films by African women filmmakers	journeefemmeafricaine.com
KIN International Film Festival	2003	Yerevan	Armenia	International		kinfestival.com
LA Femme Film Festival	2005	Los Angeles	United States	International		lafemme.org
Laboratorio Immagine Donna	1979	Florence	Italy	International		iwfffirenze.it/
Lady Filmmakers Film Festival	2007	Beverly Hills	United States	International	Short films	https://www.ladyfilmmakers.com/
LadyBug Festival	2009	Gothenburg	Sweden	International	Short films	ladybugfestival.com
Les Femmes Underground International Film Festival	2015	Phoenix/Traveling	United States	International		lesfemmesinternational.org
Lethal Lesbian	2008	Tel Aviv	Israel	International	Film festival by and about women who love women	lethallesbian.com
London Feminist Film Festival	2012	London	United Kingdom	International	Screens feminist films by female filmmakers; ceased in 2019	londonfeministfilmfestival.wordpress.com
London Lesbian Film Festival	1991	London, Ontario	Canada	International	Lesbian-interest films	llff.ca
LUNAFEST	2000	Traveling, multi-city	United States	International	Short films	lunafest.org
Malmö Arab Film Festival	2011	Malmö	Sweden	International	Arab cinema	maffswe.com
Udada Film Festival	2014	Nairobi	Kenya	International	Celebrating women in the arts	http://dadatrust.net
Melbourne Women in Film Festival	2017	Melbourne	Australia	National		mwff.org.au
MicGenero	2012	Mexico City	Mexico	International	Brings gender studies and human rights closer to a diverse audience	micgenero.com
Mis Me Binga	2009	Yaoundé	Cameroon	International		mismebinga.wordpress.com
Mujeres Cine y la TV	2002	Mexico City	Mexico	International		mujerescineytv.org
Mujeres en Foco		Buenos Aires	Argentina	International		mujeresenfoco.com.ar
Mumbai Women's International Film Festival	2013	Mumbai	India	International	Disbanded in 2014	
Mzansi Women Film Festival	2012	Johannesburg	South Africa	International	Apparently ceased in 2017	
Ndiva Women’s Film Festival	2017	Accra	Ghana	International	Films by African women and women of African descent	ndivawff.org
Nevada Women's Film Festival	2015	Las Vegas	United States	International		nwffest.com
No Man's Land Film Festival	2015	Aspen	United States	Special interest	Adventure films	nomanslandfilmfestival.org
Olhares do Mediterrâneo - Cinema no Feminino	2013	Lisbon	Portugal	International	Screens films by Mediterranean women	olharesdomediterraneo.org
Paris Lesbian and Feminist Film Festival	1989	Paris	France	International	A women-only film festival screening lesbian and feminist films	cineffable.fr
Port Townsend Film Festival - Women & Film	2017	Port Townsend	United States	International	Edition of the general Port Townsend Film Festival	ptfilmfest.com
Porto Femme - International Film Festival	2018	Porto	Portugal	International	An international film festival dedicated to people who identify as women.	
Post Alley Film Festival		Seattle	United States	International	Short films	postalleyfilmfestival.com
POW Film Fest	2008	Portland	United States	International		powfilmfest.com
Reel Sisters of the Diaspora	1997	Brooklyn	United States	International	Festival for women of color filmmakers	reelsisters.com
Queer Women of Color Film Festival	2005	San Francisco	United States	International	Free event featuring work by queer women of color, to combat bias and nurture artist-activists, leading to social change	qwocmap.org/festival
Rocky Mountain Women's Film Festival	1987	Colorado Springs	United States	International		rmwfilminstitute.org
SAGA: Adelaide International Women's Film Festival	2019	Adelaide	Australia	International	Based on SAGA: Stockholm Women's Film Festival; grassroots festival aiming to enable women and girls to tell and shape their own stories.	sagaadelaidewiff.com
Scream Queen Filmfest Tokyo	2013	Tokyo	Japan	Special interest	Horror, science fiction, dark-fantasy, thriller, noir, horror-comedy; defunct since 2016?	SQFFT
Season Film Festival	2001	Helsinki	Finland	International	Stems from the Woman or Artichoke film festival created in 2001; tagline: "Love & Anarchy"	hiff.fi/seasonfilmfestival
Seoul International Women's Film Festival	1987	Seoul	South Korea	International		siwff.or.kr
Shashat Women’s Film Festival	2005	Ramallah	Palestine		Longest-running women's festival in the Arab world, with screenings in the West Bank and the Gaza Strip	shashat.org
Some Prefer Cake	2006	Bologna	Italy	International	Lesbian film festival	someprefercakefestival.com
St. John’s International Women’s Film Festival	1989	St. John's	Canada	International		womensfilmfestival.com
Stockholm Feminist Film Festival	2017	Stockholm	Sweden	International	Largest women's film festival in Scandinavia	sthlmfemfilm.se
Stranger With My Face	2012	Hobart, Tasmania	Australia	Special interest	Horror and related genres; on hiatus	
Sydney Women's International Film Festival (SWIFF)	2021	Sydney	Australia	International	To support gender diversity in the film industry	www.swiff.org.au/
THE ONE International Women’s Film Festival	2016	Chengdu	China	International		
Through Women’s Eyes	2000	Sarasota	United States	International		throughwomenseyes.com
Topaz Film Festival (formerly Flicks by Chicks)	2001	Dallas	United States	International	Films by independent filmmakers with women in at least two key roles	wifdallas.org
TRICKY WOMEN/TRICKY REALITIES	2001	Vienna	Austria	Special interest	Animation	trickywomen.at
Underwire Festival	2010	London	United Kingdom	International		underwirefestival.com
Uptilt Film Fest	1996	Wilmington, NC	United States	International, Short films	Short films made by female or gender-expansive filmmakers	uptiltfilmfest.org
Vancouver Women in Film Festival	1989	Vancouver	Canada	International		womeninfilm.ca
Vierte Welle Film Festival	2019	Berlin	Germany	International		https://viertewellefestival.com
WOCAF - Women of Color Arts and Film	2005	Atlanta and Lagos	United States Nigeria	International		wocaf.org
Women+Film	2010	Denver	United States	International	Women's film festival edition of the Denver Film Festival	denverfilm.org/women-plus-film-festival
Women International Film Festival	2017	Islamabad	Pakistan	International	Encourages and facilitates young girls and women to raise their voice and create social change through filmmaking	womenthroughfilm.com
Women Make Waves	1993	Taipei	Taiwan	International		wmw.org.tw
WOMEN Media Arts and Film Festival	2013	Sydney	Australia	International	Women's film and media	cinewest.org
Women of African Descent Film Festival	2002	Brooklyn	United States	International	Short films	brooklynartscouncil.org
Women of Color Film Festival	1987	Santa Cruz	United States	International	Films by WOC, providing a platform for critical explorations of race, nation, class, gender, ethnicity, and sexuality	qwocmap.org
Women of the Lens	2018	London	United Kingdom	International	Film, broadcast, and digital programming, celebrating and highlighting achievements of black women and WOC in UK	womenofthelens.com
Women Over 50 Film Festival	2015	Lewes	United Kingdom	International	Work of older women on screen and behind the camera, an annual short film festival	wofff.co.uk
Women Texas Film Festival	2016	Dallas	United States	International	Tagline: Leaders, Radicals, Storytellers. Final festival held in 2020.	womentxff.org
Women's Film Festival	1990	Brattleboro	United States	International		womensfilmfestival.org
Women’s Film Festival San Diego		San Diego	United States	International	Hosted by Women's Museum of California for female filmmakers	womensfilmfestivalsandiego.com
Women's Film Society Bangladesh	2013	Dhaka	Bangladesh		On hold	
Women’s International Film & Arts Festival	2005	Miami & New York	United States	International		womensfilmfest.com
Women's International Film & Television Showcase	2008	Los Angeles	United States	International		thewifts.org
Women’s Rights Nights	2010	Skopje	North Macedonia	International	Documentary film festival, screening films relating to women's rights	womensrightsnights.net
Women’s Voices Now Online Film Fest	2010	Online		International	Advocating social impact through films about women’s rights issues	womensvoicesnow.org
Women X Film Festival	2020	Darlington	United Kingdom	International		filmfreeway.com/WomenX
Worldwide Women's Film Festival	2018	Phoenix	United States	International		wwfilmfestival.com

== See also ==
- International Women's Film Festival (disambiguation)
- List of film festivals
- List of LGBT film festivals
- List of LGBT-related films directed by women
- Women's cinema
