= Chinese medicine and public health =

Chinese medicine and public health may refer to:

- Traditional Chinese medicine
- Traditional Chinese medicine and public health
- Medicine in China
- Health in China
