= AXW =

AXW may refer to:

- Another Experiment by Women Film Festival, a film festival founded in New York City in 2010 by Lili White
- Axway Software, (Euronext ticker code AXW), an American publicly held information technology company
