= Malnutrition in Tibet =

Malnutrition is an important health concern in Tibet. According to a study conducted in 1994/1995 in eleven districts of Tibet, malnutrition affected more than half of the children from 1–7 years old. The major cause was poverty.

A 2014 study analyzing data from 1995 to 2010 found a gradual declining trend of malnutrition rates among both boys and girls. In 2010, the stunting rate was 9.3% for boys in 2010 and 10.8% for girls. A number of other health conditions are seen in Tibetan children affected by stunting, including rickets.

Malnutrition also affects the elderly in Tibet, especially those hospitalised. Research has found that nutritional therapy can improve outcomes for pulmonary patients on the Tibetan plateau.

== Diet ==
The traditional Tibetan diet is high in salt and saturated fats. Intake of fresh fruits and vegetables are limited.

== See also ==
- Health in China
