= Beirut Film Festival =

Beirut Film Festival may refer to:

- Beirut International Film Festival
- Beirut International Women Film Festival
