= Zhejiang Xinhua Compassion Education Foundation =

Chinese child nutrition organization

- Formation: 2007
- Founder: Wang JiaXuan
- Founded at: Rural China
- Type: Non-Profit Organization
- Purpose: Nutrition for children
- Location: China
- Services: Breakfast for school children

Zhejiang Xinhua Compassion Education Foundation was founded by Wang JiaXuan in 2007.

The NGO's main area of concern is that children in rural China often go to school with an empty stomach because they do not have the money for breakfast. This causes them to be malnourished and affects both their mental concentration and physical body growth. As education is seen as a way to improve the standard of living and help them to break out of the poverty trap, it is necessary for children to have enough nutrition, especially when young. In an experiment conducted by Rural Education Action Project (REAP), results showed that when kids in China were given vitamin pills, they tended to score better than their counterparts who were not given the pills.

To solve ththisat issue, Zhejiang Xinhua Compassion Education Foundation has launched a "One Child One Egg" program that ensures that schooling children get an egg a day for breakfast to provide them with the necessary nutrients for mental and physical growth. The program covers four main mountainous areas in China: Guizhou, Gansu, Sichuan and Anhui. An egg a day may look negligible to some, but the nutrients contained in an egg can help boost the growth of these malnourished children. Eggs contain high amounts of protein, fat, cholesterol and amino acids which are beneficial to a growing child.

The NGO has also tried to highlight this issue by inviting the media to observe the program. MediaCorp Channel U has been invited to follow members of the NGO to transport the eggs from the farm to the school before the students cook them for breakfast. The route to the school was uneven, and great care was taken to ensure that the eggs were not broken.

== See also ==
- Health in China
