= Crossroads Centre Beijing =

Non-governmental organization in China

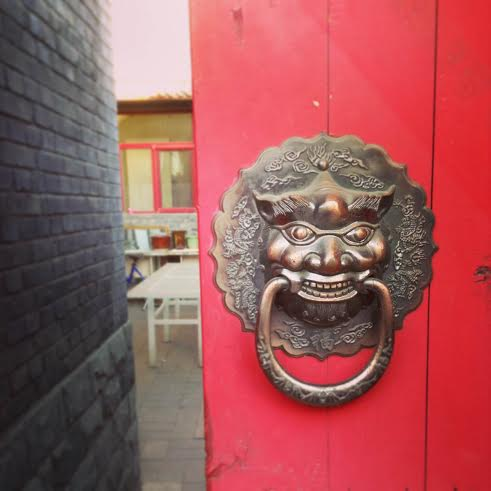
The Crossroads Centre Beijing.

The Crossroads Centre is a Chinese non-governmental organisation (NGO) based in Beijing. The organization is run by a small group employees who seek to raise awareness about women's rights and LGBTQ+ rights in China through the use of film and art. The centre itself is also a community space with a gallery and film screening venue. The primary event organized by the centre is the China Women's Film Festival which takes place in Beijing and then goes on tour to 10 other Chinese cities each year.

== History ==
The Crossroads Centre, originally called Dongjen Centre for Human Rights Education, was created in 2003 and was initially set up by the founder and director Li Dan to help raise awareness about HIV and AIDS in China in response to the Henan province blood disaster. Since opening the NGO has developed its mission to focus on raising awareness of the discrimination faced by marginalized groups in China.

== Aims ==
The NGO aims to strengthen Chinese civil society through planning film screenings and art exhibitions which focus primarily on women's rights and the LGBTQ+ rights. In addition, the Crossroads Centre organizes workshops, panel discussions, and trainings to help further awareness of women in art, and help foster the potential of young female filmmakers. The events coordinated by the Crossroads Centre are held in cities all over China and are attended by both local and international audiences.

The NGO has many partners, which include UN Women, UNDP, UNHCR, foreign embassies in Beijing, cultural and art spaces, universities, partner film festivals, bookstores and cafes. It also attracts many Chinese and foreign volunteers.

== Film Festivals ==
The Crossroads Centre is involved in a variety of film festivals, but places special importance on the China Women's Film Festival and the 1905 Hong Kong Human Rights Film Festival.

=== China Women's Film Festival (CWFF) ===
The China Women's Film Festival (CWFF) has been running since 2013. It takes place every September in Beijing, and then goes on tour to around 10 cities all over China. The China Women's Film Festival (CWFF) aims to address gender inequality through a variety of films, forums, and discussions dealing with women's issues. The CWFF works to increase public awareness and visibility of female directors, women in art, and the multitude of challenges facing women around the world. The festival presents an opportunity for national and international filmmakers, academics and female activists to network, exchange ideas and strengthen women's roles in the film community. All activities center on promoting women's rights and stimulating women's self-awareness through the medium of film.

==== History ====
The first China Women's Film Festival was organized in November and December 2013 by several individuals and organizations that had the same goal: use art and culture as a means to raise awareness about the many issues that women face today.

In 2014, the festival received the second place Intercultural Achievement Award given out by the Austrian Ministry of Foreign Affairs. Since receiving this award, the scope of the festival has widened and it is now part of a larger project related to gender equality. In addition to simply screening films, the festival now includes events that aim to develop a strong network of female Chinese film directors, as well as activities organized by student groups that are related to film and gender equality. These additional projects help to foster a local network of film directors who produce work related to women empowerment.

==== Partners ====
The film festival is supported by UN Women and its HeforShe campaign, which provides a platform for people of every gender identity and expression to come together and continue the fight for gender equality. The festival's sponsors include the Dutch Embassy, Norwegian Embassy, Delegation of the European Union to China and Austrian Ministry of Foreign Affairs. Its partners include the Chilean Embassy, Swiss Embassy, Rotaract Beijing, and the venues mentioned above.

=== 1905 Hong Kong Human Rights Film Festival ===
The 1905 Film Festival (Hong Kong Human Rights Film Festival) is an intercultural event that aims to raise awareness about human rights issues in Hong Kong and mainland China through the organization of film screenings, discussions and debates with filmmakers and activists. The First Festival was undertaken over 8 days in December 2016.

==== History of the name ====
1905, China produced its first film, "The Battle of Dingjunshan". In that same year, the Qing Emperor sent five ministers abroad to study constitutionalism, the first step towards establishing constitutionalism in China. In 1905, China took landmark strides in both film and human rights, which is why this festival has been named after the date.

== Other Activities ==
=== EVAW Art Exhibition ===
Coinciding with the International Day for the Elimination of Violence against Women, the EVAW Art Exhibition showcases both Chinese and international artworks exploring the theme of violence against women. The event, which promotes the cooperation between art and feminism, brings together artists as vital agents of change to further the cause of gender equality in China. EVAW Art Exhibition is organized by the Crossroads Centre, the China Women's Film Festival, UN Women and the UN Theme Group on Gender.

"The on-going need for concerted action to end violence and abuse is highlighted every year on the International Day for Elimination of Violence against Women (EVAW Day). This year, the Women's Rights Art Exhibition marked EVAW day in China in a unique manner. Art has a way of bringing light on issues in a subtle but yet provoking manner. Art, in most cases, is that voice that breaks the silence for us when we are not brave enough to do it on our own, or when we simply need a voice stronger than our own.

The art displayed in this exhibition has done just that. Domestic violence has never been a topic that is easy to speak about. The stigmatization that surrounds it often forces victims, families, and societies to resort to silence and isolation. Fortunately, through the efforts of local governments, NGOs and the international community over the past decade, this situation is slowly changing in China. Domestic violence is becoming a matter of public concern." - Julie Broussard Country Director for UN WOMEN

=== Discussions ===
Many guests such as filmmakers, authors, activists, journalists, and diplomats participate in discussions at the Crossroads Centre, where they share their knowledge and encourage the audience to challenge their beliefs and consider new ideas.

=== Film Screenings ===
These monthly screenings are held as networking style events and not only demonstrate meaningful art through the form of film, but also serve to bring communities together to discuss social issues.

== Awards ==
=== Reebok Human Rights Award ===
In 2006, The Crossroads Centre Director Li Dan was awarded the Reebok Human Rights Award for his work in promoting human rights, which he continues through the centre.

=== Intercultural Achievement Award 2014 ===
The China Women's Film Festival, one of the centre's main projects, won second place at the Intercultural Achievement Award 2014 from the Federal Ministry of Austria, Integration and Foreign Affairs.
