= Women Over 50 Film Festival =

Film festival in Brighton, UK

Women Over 50 Film Festival WOFFF
- Location: Lewes, UK
- Established: 2015
- Website: wofff.co.uk

Women Over 50 Film Festival (WOFFF) is a festival founded in Brighton, UK, in 2015, to address age and gender imbalances faced by older women in the film industry. The festival screens films that have a woman over 50 in a key creative role (writer, producer, director), or are about a woman over 50.

== History ==
Women Over 50 Film Festival (WOFFF) is a Community Interest Company, established in 2015. The goal behind the organization is to redress not only the gender imbalance present in the film industry, but the even greater gap experienced by older women. The organization cites industry research indicating that out of 2000 films analyzed, women between the ages of 42 and 69 spoke only 20% of the dialog, while men of the same age range spoke about 40% – twice as much. This, in addition to the general gap indicated by the Directors UK organization, which reported that of over 2,500 films made from 2005 to 2014, only 13% were directed exclusively by women.

The festival aims are to:

- Showcase the work of older women on screen and behind the camera
- Create a film community centered around older women
- Help combat isolation and loneliness in older women

WOFFF declares itself inclusive and intersectional, and has grown steadily since its inception. In 2015, the prototype event was held, entitled "Short Hot Flush Film Festival". At this event, 27 international short films were screened, a panel event was conducted, and four prizes were awarded. By 2019, over 50 films were screened, including two features, and the number of attendees and accompanying events grew accordingly, to include workshops, panels, lectures and master classes. In 2020, due to restrictions put in place during COVID-19, WOFFF become a 5-day online festival, screening 58 short films, hosting 8 virtual filmmaker Q&A sessions and a lecture by Dr. Francesca Sobande of Cardiff University.

Since 2021 WOFFF has offered a hybrid festival experience - an in-person festival, held at Depot cinema in Lewes, UK, and a virtual festival hosted online on the Eventive platform.

== The WOFFF lecture ==
WOFFF hosts an annual lecture concentrating on older women in film and TV. Academics invited to deliver lectures from English, Welsh and US universities and their lecture topics have included:

Year	Lecture delivered by	From	Lecture Title
WOFFF17	Dr Patricia McManus	University of Brighton	Women over 50 in Dystopian Fictions The Handmaid's Tale Gender and Race
WOFFF18	Dr. Deborah Jermyn	University of Roehampton	“Your Age is One of My Favorite Things About You”: The Ageing Romcom Heroine in the Films of Nancy Meyers
WOFFF19	Dr. Brenda Weber	Indiana University Bloomington	I am (Older) Woman: Hear Me Roar!: Rethinking the Incredible Invisible Older Woman
WOFFF20	Dr. Francesca Sobande	Cardiff University	Black women over 50 on screen: from intersectional oppression in the industry to defying ageist agendas
WOFFF21	Professor Kate Taylor-Jones	Sheffield University	The First Lady of Korean Cinema, Youn Yuh-jung
WOFFF23	Dr. Deborah Jermyn	University of Roehampton	Menopause and the Media in the UK - 'The Menopausal Turn'
WOFFF24	Dr Vicky Ball	De Montfort University	Older Women and Television Drama
WOFFF25	Sara Pesce	University of Bologna	Isabella Rossellini – Performing Age, Embodying Difference

== Awards ==
Awards are granted in the following categories:

- Audience Choice Award
- Best Animation
- Best Documentary
- Best Drama
- Best Experimental
- Best Short Script
- Best Student Film

The award-winning films are eligible to participate in WOFFF's Moving Pictures project - screening WOFFF short films in community spaces, cinemas and elder-care residential homes in the UK.

=== Past winners ===
Year	Award	Work	Winner
	Audience Choice Award	Home Movie	Caroline Pick
2015	Best Animation	Mend and Make Do	Bexie Bush
2015	Best Documentary	Home Movie	Caroline Pick
2015	Best Drama	Sewing Solutions	Marc Beidul
2016	Audience Choice Award	One Last Dance	Luke Losey
2016	Best Animation	My Friend Marjorie	Louise Wilde
2016	Best Documentary	Belle and Emma	Rebecca Johanson
2016	Best Drama	The Other Place	Mareike Engelhardt
2016	Best Experimental	The Wake	Oonagh Kearney
2017	Audience Choice Award	Days of Awe	Rehanna Rose
2017	Best Animation	Espressivo: A Love Song to Coffee	Deb Ethier
2017	Best Experimental	Cherry Colour Buttonholes	Brenda Miller
2017	Best Documentary	Rebel Menopause	Adele Tulli
2017	Best Drama	The Hide	Gaynor Macfarlane
2018	Audience Choice Award	Edek	Malcolm Green
2018	Best Animation	Tough	Jennifer Zheng
2018	Best Documentary	I’m Fine	Lucretia Knapp
2018	Best Drama	The Matchmaker	Leonora Pitts
2018	Best Experimental	Edek	Malcolm Green
2018	Best Student Film	Grandmother	Heather Dirckze, Charanpreet Khaira, Melina Campos
2019	Audience Choice Award	We Were Thamesmead	Lucia Tambini
2019	Best Animation	In the House of Paper Flowers	Anita George
2019	Best Documentary	We Were Thamesmead	Lucia Tambini
2019	Best Drama	The Last Mermaid	Fi Kelly
2019	Best Experimental	House of Our Own	Dagmar Scheibert
2019	Best Short Script	Love Is	Dylanne Corcoran
2019	Best Student Film	Forget-Me-Not	Sarah Smith
2020	Audience Choice Award	Wings	Jamie Weston
2020	Best Animation	The Witch & the Baby	Evgenia Golubeva
2020	Best Documentary	The Passionate Pursuits of Angela Bowen	Jennifer Abod
2020	Best Drama	Wine Lake	Platon Theodoris
2020	Best Experimental	Haud Close Tae Me	Eve McConnachie
2020	Best Short Script	3 Down	Denise Deegan
2020	Best Student Film	Delta	Jules St-Jean
2021	Audience Choice Award	The Birth Of Valerie Venus	Sarah Clift
2021	Best Animation	Nanakorobi (Seven Falls)	Glenna Burmer & Gaby Breiter
2021	Best Documentary	Joy Uncensored	Natasha Hawthornthwaite
2021	Best Drama	The Exit Plan	Angus Wilkinson
2021	Best Experimental	Lay Me Low	Marlene Millar
2021	Best Short Script	'Weightless'	Louise Monaghan
2021	Best Student Film	El Habbasa (Fishing Net)	Dania Elmor
2021	TENA Ageless Award	Stay with Her	Yang Chen
2022	Audience Choice Award	Three Women	Annika Lewandowski
2022	Best Animation	Treasure	Samantha Moore
2022	Best Documentary	Cuban American Gothic	Maria Teresa Rodriguez
2022	Best Drama	Housemaid #2	Roxanne Stam
2022	Best Experimental	Blind as a Beat	Jessi Gutch & Liz Jackson
2022	Best Short Script	MOTHER	Maureen Hansch
2022	Best Student Film	Three Women	Annika Lewandowski
2023	Audience Choice Award	Linda	Joe Lycett
2023	Best Animation	Twenty Objects from a Sixties Childhood	Cally Trench
2023	Best Documentary	This is What the World Looks Like When You're Gone	Steen Starr
2023	Best Drama	The Call	Riffy Ahmed
2023	Best Experimental	Scored by Time	Nicola Hawkins
2023	Best Short Script	Müggelsee	Milly James
2023	Best Student Film	My Sisters In The Stars: The Story of Lee Yong-soo	Ian Kim
2024	Audience Choice Award	To Be Announced - Oct 2024	To Be Announced - Oct 2024
2024	Best Animation	Two One Two	Shira Avni
2024	Best Documentary	Outside In, Life Of A Figure Model	Etti Inbal
2024	Best Drama	Doll Woman	Tokio Oohara
2024	Best Experimental	AM NOT OK	Gabrielle Lansner
2024	Best Short Script	Cat Lady	Alison Wilson
2024	Best Student Film	Dead Air	Ronja Ehlers, Inês Filipa Palma Martins, Melissa Fabienne Klein, Lucía Artiles De Urioste
2025	Audience Choice Award	Pegs & Bacon	Sarah Mason
2025	Best Animation	The Illustrated Woman	Isabel Hergura
2025	Best Documentary	Risa	Kate Weare, Jack Flame Sorokin
2025	Best Drama	The Pearl Comb	Ali Cook
2025	Best Experimental	Somber Tides	Chantal Caron
2025	Best Short Script	Rafta,Rafta (Slowly,Slowly)	Misha Hassan
2025	Best Student Film	Chai-Coffi	Sanjoli Malani
2026	Audience Choice Award	Announced November 2026	
	Best Animation	Lina	Margarida Madeira
	Best Documentary	Intermittent & Continuous	Olivia Hird
	Best Drama	Reliefs	Juan Manuel González
	Best Experimental	Hag-Stone	Kate Clayton
	Best Short Script	Princess	Ros Borland
	Best Student Film	Birgitte	Maria Zaikina

== WOFFF in the community ==
Through WOFFF's Best of the Fest touring programme, WOFFF brings award-winning films to independent cinemas across the UK, introducing new audiences to short films and the filmmakers behind them.

The WOFFF community programme, Moving Pictures, extends this work further. Designed for care homes, community groups and charities, it combines a special curated collection of WOFFF films with creative resources that encourage conversation, reminiscence and artistic expression, helping people connect through film wherever they are.

In 2024, WOFFF began a partnership with Virgin Atlantic, launching the world's first collection of dementia-friendly short films for an airline's inflight entertainment. The programme has been viewed more than 60,000 times by passengers around the world

== See also ==
- List of women's film festivals
