= In Our Own Way =

- Poster
- Directed by: Wilma Massucco
- Written by: Wilma Massucco
- Produced by: Wilma Massucco
- Music by: Peter Lee
- Distributed by: Mountain River Films
- Release date: 29 June 2013
- Running time: 71 minutes
- Country: Italy
- Languages: Italian, English

In Our Own Way (Italian: A Mon(n)do nostro) is a 2013 documentary written, directed and produced by Italian director Wilma Massucco, telling the story of five women and their relationship with men. The project received Special Mention Award at the Mumbai Women's International Film Festival 2013. Five women tell their stories of relationships with a men – uncensored, unvarnished they reveal deep and intimate truths of love's many facets. Five female perspectives, exploring five different ways of loving a man: dreamed love, suffered love, lost love, denied love and realized love.

== Festivals & Awards ==
- Special Mention Award at Mumbai Women's International Film Festival 2013
- Official Selection at Mumbai Women's International Film Festival 2013
- Official Selection at Sciacca Film Festival 2013
- Official Selection at Skyline Indie Film Festival 2013
