= Home movie (disambiguation) =

A home movie is a film made by amateurs.

Home Movie or Home Movies may also refer to:

- Home video, films or television shows rented or sold in a video format for home use, or amateur video recordings, or the technology of home video recording and reproduction generally
- Home Movie (2001 film), a 2001 documentary film by Chris Smith
- Home Movie (2008 film), a horror film
- Home Movie (2013 film), a short documentary biographical film
- Home Movie: The Princess Bride, a 2020 celebrity "fan remake" of the 1987 film The Princess Bride
- Home Movies (TV series), a 1999–2004 cartoon television program
- Home Movies (film), a 1980 film directed by Brian De Palma
- Home Movies (musical), a 1964 "Off-Off-Broadway" musical scored by Al Carmines
- Home Movies (video), a 1995 music video by Pennywise
- Home Movies (album), The Best of Everything But the Girl 2001
- Home Movies, a 1997 novel by Ray Robertson
- "Home Movies" (Dawson's Creek), a 1999 television episode
- "Home Movies", a 1954 episode of the sitcom I Love Lucy (1951–1957)
- Home Movies (song), a 2023 single by Lukas Graham and Mickey Guyton
