= Hygienic Modernity =

2004 anthropological work by Ruth Rogaski

Hygienic Modernity: Meanings of Health and Disease in Treaty-Port China
- Author: Ruth Rogaski
- Language: English
- Published: 2004 (University of California Press)
- Publication place: United States of America
- Pages: 418
- ISBN: 9780520930605

Hygienic Modernity, published in 2004, is an anthropological work in ten chapters by Ruth Rogaski that describes the Chinese conceptualization of hygiene, or weisheng (Chinese: 卫生; pinyin: Wèishēng), over the course of a century as a national value as well as the central vehicle for modernization. The book's body of politico-cultural evidence presents the emergence of the medicalized view of China as a sick, deficient nation, weakened by a semicolonial past in the early 1900s, as well as the resulting internalization of said national illness resulting in normative shifts and new policy implements that have changed the urban built environment. This created new semantic meanings of weisheng, which had Chinese cosmological significance prior to the mid-nineteenth century. Rogaski traces the changing meaning of this concept through the case study of the transformation of the treaty-port city of Tianjin, cite of multiple foreign concessions and several of China's first important medical institutions such as the country's first municipal department of health and first medical academy. Hygienic Modernity is in fact Rogaski's own translation of the contemporary meaning of weisheng. This book has been critically acclaimed for its pluralistic perspective, including the subaltern of Tianjin, as well as its transnational scope.

== Funding ==
Hygienic Modernity received funding from:

- Committee for Scholarly Communication with the People's Republic of China
- The Fulbright-Hayes Doctoral Dissertation Research Abroad Fellowship
- Yale University Prize Fellowship in East Asian Studies
- Princeton University Committee on Research in the Humanities and Social Sciences
- Princeton University Department of History

== Content ==
=== "Semi-colonialism" of Tianjin City ===
At the dawn of the twentieth century, China was known as "The Sick Man of the Far East", recovering from opium addiction, faced with an outbreak of the pneumonic plague and facing difficulties in governance. Nearly ten foreign concessions were made in Tianjin between 1860 and 1943, outside of the Chinese-administered zone. Japanese, British, French, German, Italian, Russian, Austro-Hungarian and Belgian concessions were all influenced by the zeitgeist of sanitation for modernization, resulting in the alteration of the urban built environment through borough delineation, the intersection of political and foreign forces, and the confluence of ideals for weisheng: so-called "hygienic regimes".

==== The Treaty of Nanking and British Imperialism ====
The end of the Second Opium War saw the opening of Hong Kong, Shanghai and other Chinese ports like Tianjin to British imperial powers. With British military dominance over the Qing dynasty, there was a national state of subservience; Tianjin city's production shifted toward the production of items like carpets that conveyed the idea of "Chineseness" to the foreign market, and both Western medicine and public health structures to prevent the spread of disease were introduced.

When social unrest reached a breaking point with both foreign presence and the Qing court, the resulting Boxing Massacre of 1900 was particularly devastating for Tianjin, its city walls breached resulting in its occupation by foreign military forces. The founding of the Tianjin Provisional Government, which acted as a colonial administrator of the region, established the roots of the nation-sanitation notion of weisheng. Increased policing and new regulations saw an implied convergence of meaning in public health and private hygiene, geren weisheng and gonggong weisheng respectively. Meaning, with armed imperialism, the shift in weisheng's meaning toward the fitness of the state also meant the perception of the individual's body as the state.

==== Italian hygiene regime ====
Italian concession had already occurred at the beginning of the twentieth century. They approached colonial transformation and spatial acquisition maintaining firm relations with the local municipal government. They sought the creation of a "neighborhood" for their concession and passed the code of hygiene in 1908 to maintain modernization goals.

=== State identity and the Patriotic Hygiene Campaign ===
The ambiguity of Chinese identity in Tianjin was made even more complex with the addition of other colonial forces, including the "Asian on Asian" Japanese occupation, which challenged the Western-centric definition of what a "colonial state" is. Despite the historically colonial significance, Chinese scholars' ambition nevertheless was to modernize China, once again shifting the meaning and use of weisheng to a nationalistic hygienic transformation and cultural value describing the fitness of the Chinese race. This era saw the emergence of Chinese eugenics and media propaganda surrounding cleanliness and one's duty to maintain cleanliness for the sake of civility within the nation. In 1942, the People's Republic recognized how public health and the strength it instills in nationhood must be anchored by a powerful State and its citizenry. Ruth Rogaski compares this new weisheng with the Foucauldian theory of biopower, describing how government disciplinary regimes result in individuals internalizing State corporal goals as their own. This new patriotic meaning brought with it the rhetoric of prevention through mobilization, and the equivalence of pestilence to foreign interference.

In 1952 alleged American use of germ warfare in Korea emboldened organized Chinese Communists efforts to effectively weaponize weisheng. These allegations were made by the Patriotic Hygiene Campaign, who described plagued rodents raining onto Gannan county. This was one of the incidents that led to the People's government urging Chinese citizens to join the Campaign and combat American pestilence.

"(March tempo, vigorously, with intense anger) American imperialism, mostrously evil! As it approaches the edge of doom, it dares to use germ warfare against the people of China and Korea! (crescendo to fortissimo:) American imperialism, monstrously evil! For the sake of the future of mankind, We resolve to wipe out germ warfare. Wipe out germ warfare! Wipe it out! Wipe it out! Wipe out germ warfare, capture the germ warfare criminals, Finish off the American imperialists and their stinking bugs and flies! Wipe out germ warfare, capture the germ warfare criminals, All of China, the whole world, must mobilize as one! Must mobilize as one!"

— Guo Moruo, "Wipe Out Germ Warfare!", To be performed at Patriotic Hygiene Campaign mass meetings, Hygienic Modernity, Chapter 10, page 285

== Awards ==
- 2004 Co-recipient of the Berkshire Prize
- 2005 Fairbank Prize in East Asian history
- 2006 Levenson Prize in Chinese studies
- 2007 Welch Medal in the history of medicine
