= LA Femme Film Festival =

Film festival showcasing and promoting films directed, produced and written by women

- Opening film: Annually in October
- Location: Los Angeles, California
- Established: 2005
- Language: English
- Website: https://lafemme.org/

LA Femme International Film Festival is an annual film festival. It focuses on platforming female filmmakers. The festival was launched in 2005, with the objective of enhancing women directors, producers, and writers, showcasing and promoting films by women filmmakers.

== History ==
The LA Femme International Film Festival was founded by Leslie LaPage in 2005. According to LaPage, securing early sponsorship was difficult because of industry skepticism of women directing outside the romantic comedy genre. The inaugural two-day festival screened 25 films. Since then, the festival has grown to include over 100 films screened over four days.

== Awards ==
The festival presents annual awards across categories that include Best Feature, Best Director, Best Screenplay, and Best Documentary. Notable past recipients include filmmaker Francesca Gregorini, who won Best Feature Director in 2013 for The Truth About Emanuel, and actress Marion Ross, who received a Lifetime Achievement Award in 2014.

== See also ==
- List of women's film festivals
