= International Black Women's Film Festival =

The International Black Women's Film Festival is or was a film festival in San Francisco, California, United States.

== History ==
In 2001, Adrienne M. Anderson established the International Black Women's Film Festival in San Francisco, California. She established the festival as an educational and charitable nonprofit and it was originally fiscally-sponsored by the (now defunct) Blue Nile Lotuses, Incorporated, a San Francisco fraternal organization and charity.

The first festival was presented November 8 to November 24, 2002, in San Francisco, CA, at the Delancey Street screening room at 600 Embarcadero Street in San Francisco's South Beach area. The first festival was founded and organized by Adrienne M. Anderson and co-organized with entrepreneur Robin Bates who is the founder and CEO of Café de la Soul and La Jolie Noire Media, and co-founder of Black Paris Divas. George Lucas donated to the inaugural festival in 2002. The opening films of the inaugural festival were a short called Funeral at the Samba School (Gurufim Na Mangueira) (2002) by director Dandara and the feature-length documentary Nobody Knows My Name (1999) by filmmaker Rachel Raimist.

== Mission ==
The International Black Women's Film Festival screens media by and/or about Black women from around the world in non-stereotypical, non-pornographic roles. IBWFF combats negative stereotyping of Black women in film, television and media. To date, the festival has screened over 400 films from five continents, including films from the following countries: United States, Brazil, Canada, France, South Africa, United Kingdom, Burkina Faso, Dominican Republic, Ethiopia, Namibia, Nigeria, Puerto Rico, Tanzania, Trinidad & Tobago, Tunisia, and Zimbabwe. Accepted films genres are: Short films, documentaries, feature films, animation, and experimental films.

== Press ==
In 2009, the festival was featured in the San Francisco Chronicle and in 2012 the San Francisco Examiner, Oakland Post and interview with radio host Wanda Saabir on Wanda's Picks.

== Events ==
The International Black Women's Film Festival includes filmmaker Q&A sessions, special appearances, gala openings, and premiere screenings.

Panel events and Q&As include:

- Meetup and screening of Beasts of the Southern Wild, opening night, July 2012
- “Flip the Script: How to Define & Control the Black Image Through Casting” – Western Addition Branch, Panelists: Velina Brown and Kathleen Antonia (San Francisco Public Library)
- “Can Hip-Hop be an Agent for Positive Change?” – San Francisco Main Library, Panelists: Sonia McDaniel, Tossie Long, Jason “Trackademics” Valerio, & Naru Kwina
- “Filtered Lens: Art as Film and the Black Image” - San Francisco Main Library, Panelists: Carolina Moraes-Liu & Shy Pacheco Hamilton
- The Next Day, Filmmaker Q&A, Panelists: Al Robbins & DeAnna Dawn
- The Unforgiving Minute, Filmmaker Q&A, Panelists: Octavia Spencer, Kelly Shipe-Vasconcelos & Devin Badgett
- Soliloquy, Panelists: Jacques Zanetti & Lillian Benson
- Love Takes Time, Panelists: Melvina & Jaylani Roberts

Special appearances include:

- Josh Penn, Producer (Beasts of the Southern Wild - USA, dir. Benh Zeitlin)
- Al Robbins, Actor & Director (The Next Day - USA, dir. Al Robbins)],
- Carolina Moraes Liu(Ebony Goddess: Queen of Ilê Aiyê & Festive Land - Brazil, dir. Carolina Moraes-Liu)
- Deanna Dawn, Actor (The Next Day - USA, dir. Al Robbins)
- Devin Badgett, Actor (The Unforgiving Minute - USA, dir. Octavia Spencer)
- Jacques Zanetti, Director (New York 45 & Soliloquy - USA, dir. Jacques Zanetti)
- Jaylani Roberts, Actor (Love Takes Time - USA, dir. Melvina)
- Jason “Trackademicks” Valerio, Musician, Rapper & Producer (Panelist: "Can Hip-Hop Serve as an Agent for Positive Change?")
- Kathleen Antonia, Actor & Director (Getting Played - USA, dir. Kathleen Antonia)
- Kelly Shipe Vasconcelos (The Unforgiving Minute - USA, dir. Octavia Spencer)
- Lillian Benson, Director & Editor (Soliloquy & All Our Sons - USA, dir. Lillian Benson)
- Melvina, Director (Love Takes Time - USA, dir. Melvina)
- Naru Kwina, Musician & Rapper (Panelist: "Can Hip-Hop Serve as an Agent for Positive Change?")
- Octavia Spencer, Actor & Director (The Unforgiving Minute - USA, dir. Octavia Spencer)
- Shy Pacheco Hamilton, Director (A Little Bit Colored a Little Bit White & Irony of a Negro Policeman - USA, dir. Shy Pacheco Hamilton)
- Sonia McDaniel, Educator (Panelist: "Can Hip-Hop Serve as an Agent for Positive Change?")
- Stacey Larkins, Director (In Search of Consonance - USA, dir. Stacey Larkins)
- Sylvia D. Hamilton, Director (Portia White: Think on Me - Canada, dir. Sylvia Hamilton)
- Tossie Long, Singer, Dancer & Actress (Panelist: "Can Hip-Hop Serve as an Agent for Positive Change?")
- Velina Brown, Actor (Milk - USA, dir. Gus Van Sant and Bee Season - USA, dirs. Scott McGehee, David Siegel )
- Venus de Milo Thomas (director, Did I Wake You?)

== See also ==
- List of women's film festivals
