= China Women's Film Festival =

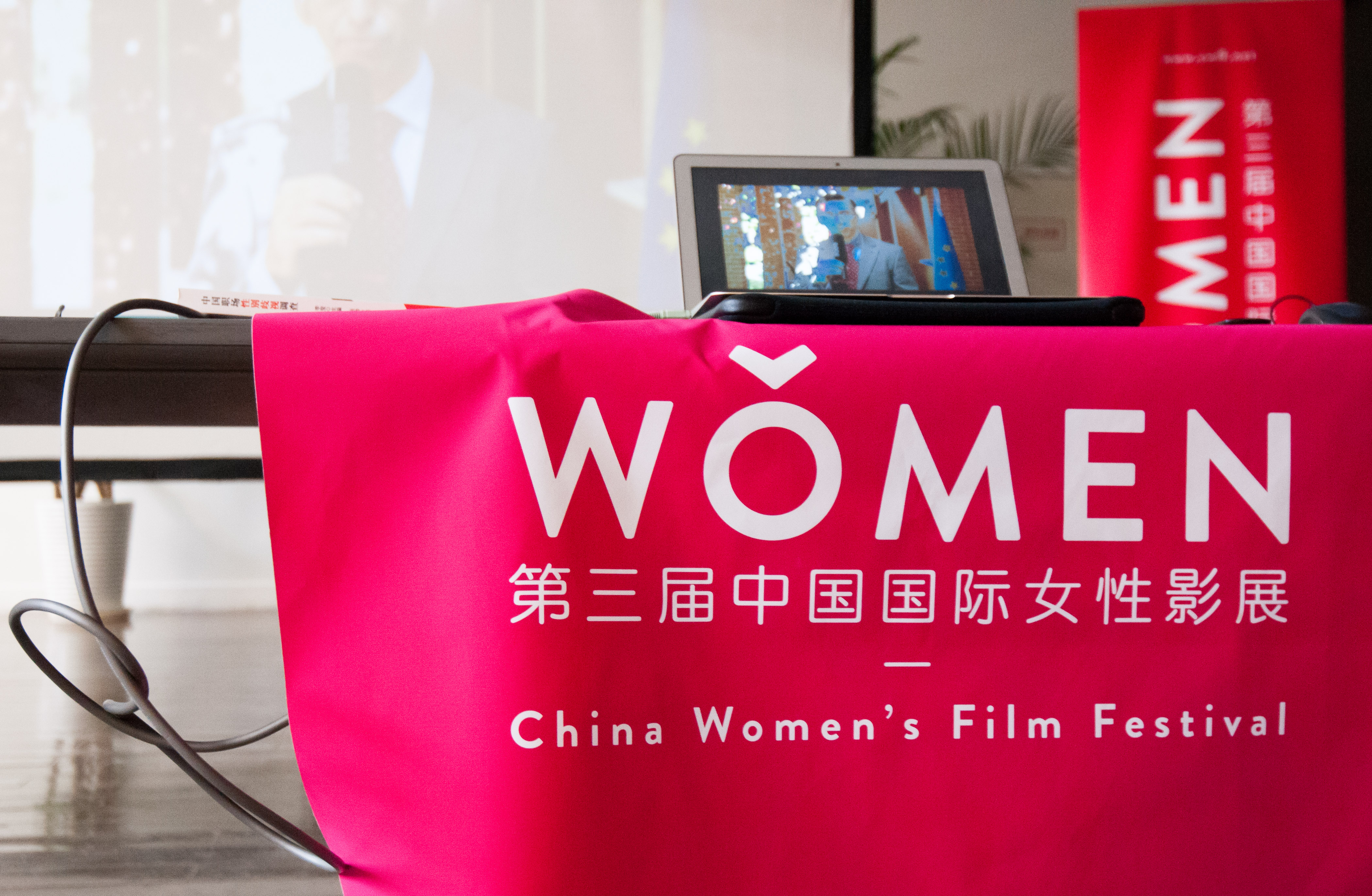
China Women's Film Festival

The China Women's Film Festival (CWFF 中國國際女性影展) was established in 2013 as an annual event. It aspires to promote women's rights and raise awareness of gender inequality through the mediums of film and art. The festival is organised by the Crossroads Centre Beijing, a Chinese NGO that aims to raise awareness on human rights issues in China.

== Background ==
The China Women's Film Festival (zh:中國國際女性影展) is an intercultural educational event, featuring a diverse range of films from predominantly female filmmakers from around the world. The festival aspires to raise awareness on the issues faced by women in China via events such as: film screenings, forums and Q&A sessions, and with the participation of filmmakers, feminists and other guests.

The CWFF takes place over 9 days every September, commencing in Beijing and touring through various cities in China for several months, focusing predominantly on second tier cities to increase awareness in less globalised locations. The first CWFF took place in 2013 across 5 cities and was the first event on such a scale focusing on film alongside women's issues in China. The next editions were a far greater success attracting a larger audience and continuing to show rapid growth.

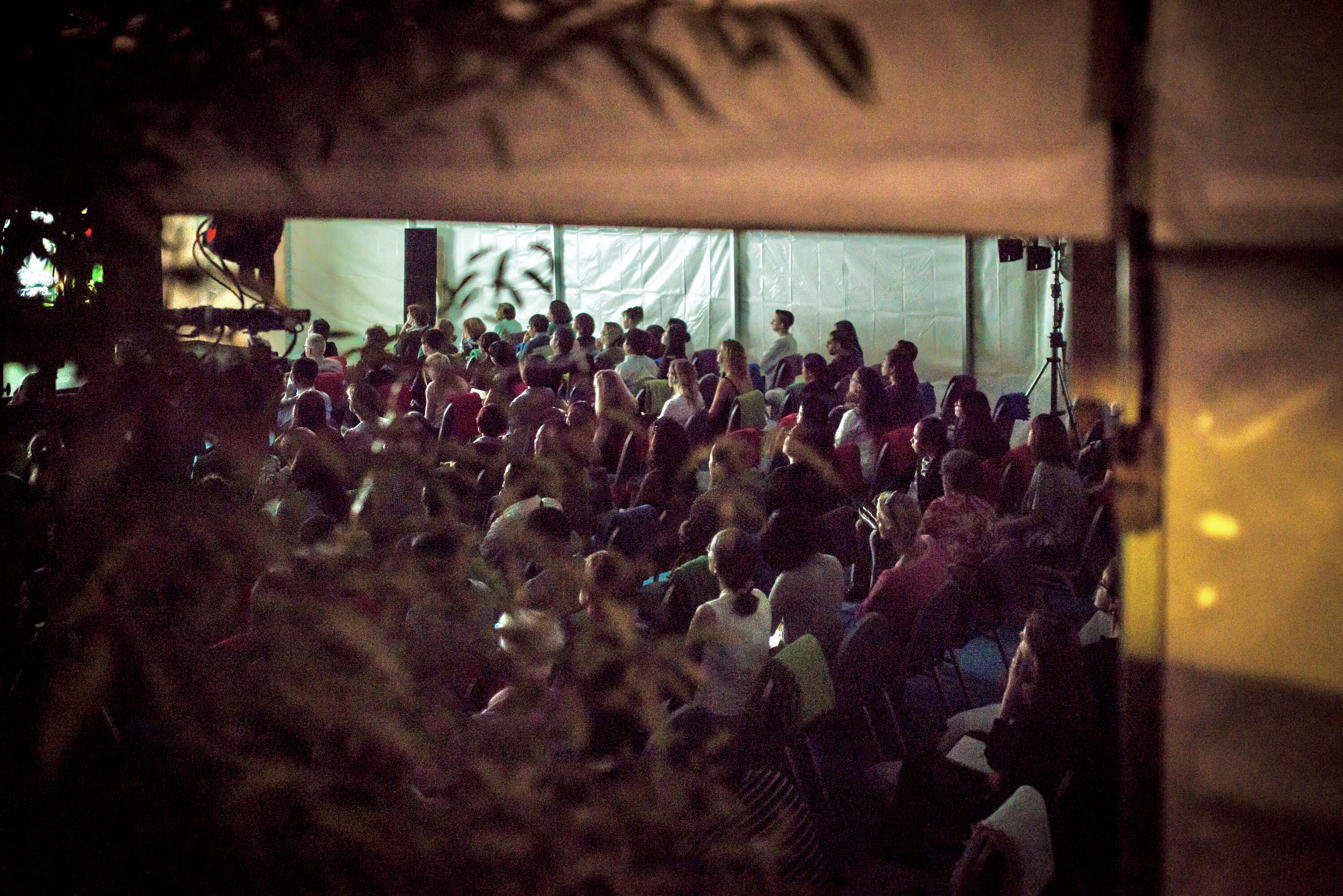
Crowd gathered to watch a film screening.

== Goals ==
The festival seeks to bolster women's place in society in aspiration of empowering them, placing women in public visible leadership roles and educating people on the importance of an equal and diverse society. The festival provides an alternative voice, debate and focal point for media attention around the topic of women's rights. It also provides a platform for female filmmakers to show their film and share their experience with the audience.

The tour aims to expand the opportunity and freedom for people to access and attend the event in cities where the opportunity to learn about such issues is rare or non-existent.

== Awards ==
In 2014 the festival won 2nd prize in the Intercultural Achievement Award, assigned by the Austrian Ministry of Foreign Affairs. The Intercultural Achievement Award is motivated by intercultural dialogue with the purpose of identifying and honouring non-profit organisations and pioneering projects constructed around education, participation and business.

== Supporters ==
The CWFF cooperates with many partners and sponsors. Since its first edition, the festival has included UN Women China and its HeforShe campaign, foreign embassies in Beijing, international and national film festivals, cultural centres, theatres, universities, cafes and bookstores.

== See also ==
- List of women's film festivals
