= F-Sides =

Romanian cineclub and feminist film festival

F-SIDES
- Location: Bucharest, Romania
- Established: 2020
- Website: https://f-sides.ro

F-Sides, sometimes stylized as F-SIDES, is a Romanian cineclub and feminist film festival. Its aim is to combat gender inequality in cinema by exclusively screening films by female creators, being the first such film society in Romania. Its main event consists of bi-monthly film screenings taking place in various venues across Bucharest over five months in summer and autumn, with several other events throughout the year.

Founded in July 2020 in Bucharest, it has since expanded to include screenings in other Romanian cities, roundtable discussions on issues of gender and cinema, art exhibitions, social research and youth programs.

== History ==
F-Sides was created in Bucharest in 2020 by Alexandra Lulache and Ioana Diaconu as a means to combat the small number of films by female directors, with only 17% of movies shown in Romanian cinemas in 2019 having been directed by a woman. According to Diaconu, the project seeks to ”bring the female perspective into the spotlight as to be a starting point for debating topics such as sorority, freedom of one’s own body, girls’ education, violence against women, exploring sexuality, motherhood or intergenerational communication”. It was the first Romanian film society to focus on female creators. Because it debuted during the COVID-19 pandemic, screenings took place in outdoor venues during the 2020 season, with some screenings moving online.

Beginning with its second year, F-Sides began expanding to other cities in Romania, with screenings taking place in Cluj-Napoca, Timișoara and Sibiu, among others. The cineclub's selection mostly consists of independent and international art films, but in 2022 it also inaugurated "F-Sides Premieres", a curatorial line which selects more recent movies which proved popular with general audiences. In April 2022, F-Sided collaborated with the archiving project of the UNATC film school to organize a retrospective of Romanian director Cristiana Nicolae, with the stated aim of re-popularizing her work among modern audiences.

In 2022 F-Sides launched a side-project called "Chapters", which consists of film screenings in small and medium-sized towns, mainly to an audience of young people, as well as of a social study researching cultural consumption among youth living in small urban areas. In October 2022, F-Sides marked the end of its third season with a contemporary art exhibition by women artists.
