= Dublin Feminist Film Festival =

Annual feminist film festival in Dublin, Ireland

- Location: Dublin
- Established: 2014
- Website: dublinfeministfilmfestival.com

Dublin Feminist Film Festival (DFFF) is an independent annual event, founded in 2014, to promote and celebrate female filmmakers, and to draw more women to get involved in filmmaking. The festival is non-competitive, and run by volunteers.

== Background ==
Dublin Feminist Film Festival (DFFF) was established in 2014. It began as a fundraiser held by Karla Healion, a feminist activist, who wanted to help Sasane, an organization in Nepal that assists women who are victims of sex trafficking, and is run by women who had been trafficked. Healion encountered Sasane while traveling, and paired her desire to help the group with her desire for a feminist film festival back home in Dublin.

DFFF cites three major goals:

- Counteracting misrepresentation and stereotypical representation of women on screen, and exposing audiences to a broader range of female characters than are found in mainstream cinema.
- Countering the under-representation of women in the film industry by screening, supporting and promoting films in which women have played a vital production role (directors, producers, writers or crew members), to empower those in the industry and to draw more women to the industry.
- Bringing the perspectives, stories and experiences of women and feminists to a wider audience through film in an inclusive, positive and friendly environment.

All films screened by the festival must be directed by women. In 2018, the festival decided to not only feature films by women directors and writers, but to focus on women cinematographers. That year, Rachel Morrison received a nomination for the Academy Award for Best Cinematography for her work on the film Mudbound. Morrison was the first woman ever to be nominated for her work behind the camera in ninety years of Oscars, and the festival saw a need to place more focus on women in this field, citing that in the year of this achievement, women constituted only 4% of cinematographers. The topic raised in screenings and discussions was whether there is a different "gaze" in films shot with a woman behind the camera.

The festival is non-competitive, but selected short films are screened in the Shorts Section, and receive prizes. DFFF also includes panel and discussion events, and a social event. The event is run by volunteers, and any proceeds made are donated to local charities.

== See also ==
- Feminism in the Republic of Ireland
- List of women's film festivals
- Women's cinema
