= Rocky Mountain Women's Film Festival =

The Rocky Mountain Women's Film Festival (RMWFF) in Colorado Springs, Colorado in the United States, is the longest-running women's film festival in North America. First launched in 1988, each year it shows documentary features, shorts and narratives, and women filmmakers from around the world attend and participate in after-film question-and-answer (Q&As) and forums.

== Overview ==
The RMWFF is a three-day film festival held annually in November. In the week leading up to the festival, a "Festival in the Community" program offers free film screenings, and a youth outreach program is offered for at-risk youths. The RMWFF also produces an event every April highlighting award-winning short films. In June, the RMWFF hosts a weekend workshop for filmmakers who have previously attended the festival. The organization also maintains the Madelyn Osur Film Library, a collection of over 200 films from past festivals.

== History ==
The Rocky Mountain Women's Film Festival was created by Jere E. Martin and Donna Guthrie in 1987 in an effort to expose Colorado Springs to films by women or about women. According to Martin, "We wanted to tap into a strong community of progressive people in Colorado Springs who valued rich and diverse information, who supported the arts and respected and affirmed life in all its different iterations. Our intention was to expand people's consciousness - including our own - and continue to grow wiser about all the important issues facing us in this world of special interests and the deft marketing viewpoints of consumerism."

== Demographics ==
Demographics vary widely among the programs. The main festival serves a largely female audience, 90% white, 50% have graduate degrees, and 32% have household incomes over $100,000. The Festival in the Community screenings generally reflect a more diverse audience, consistent with the location of the screening (University of Colorado Colorado Springs (UCCS) sees mostly a college-age audience while the screening at the Pikes Peak Public library attracts more retirees).

The Youth Outreach Program reaches an entirely different demographic: many more males than females, with ages ranging from 12 to 18.

== Youth Outreach Program ==
The Youth Outreach program targets a broad segment of the community that may not be able to see the festival itself. This part of the festival is directed at youth, ages 12–18, who live in many different areas around Colorado Springs. The participants in this program are exposed to a variety of films and filmmakers, in order to expose youth to the world around them and the art of film making.

== See also ==
- List of women's film festivals
