= Women of Color Film Festival =

Film festival in Santa Cruz, California

The Women of Color Film Festival was founded in 1991, organized by graduate students at the University of California, Santa Cruz.

The festival's programming practice has historically avoided judging films as "good" or "bad", and included work by self-taught filmmakers and students. The emphasis is on showing a range of perspectives. The organizers have experimented with screening films in a variety of spaces such as dining halls, gymnasiums, outdoor courtyards, and off-campus community centers.

== See also ==
- List of women's film festivals
