= International Festival of Women's Films =

Film festival in New York City 1972–1976

The International Festival of Women's Films was an international film festival held in New York City in 1972 and 1976. The 1972 edition of the festival is significant for being the first major women's film festival.

== Background ==
By the late 60s, film festivals had begun to shift towards selecting films on the basis of theme, rather than on the basis of decisions made by national film committees. This change was initiated by the Pesaro International Film Festival of Italy, founded in 1964, and soon embraced by newly emerging festivals such as Panafrican Film and Television Festival of Ouagadougou (FESPACO) in Burkina Faso, founded in 1969. Despite this re-organization, women filmmakers and film programmers were still underrepresented at these larger, politicized festivals.

Similarly, within the context of the broader Second-wave feminism movement, a Feminist film movement had begun to emerge by the late 1960s and early 1970s. This movement consisted of theoretical work by feminist scholars such as Laura Mulvey and Claire Johnston, the publishing of film journals explicitly concerned with feminism, such as Women & Film (1972-1975), and special issues in Take One, Film Library Quarterly, and The Velvet Light Trap, and the establishment of organizations to encourage film production by women, such as Women Make Movies (established in 1969).

== Festival ==
=== First International Festival of Women's Films (1972) ===
The International Festival of Women's Films was founded by screenwriter Kristina Nordstrom in 1972, who also served as festival director. Nordstrom has previously worked as an assistant to Richard Roud, the co-founder and program director of the New York Film Festival. Publicity materials for the festival stated that its purpose was:

- to discover and exhibit the work of new filmmakers;
- to permit a general audience to see films made by women that have not received wide distribution;
- to make the public aware of the great number of highly creative women working in film;
- to see the images that women are creating for themselves; and
- to present a comprehensive exhibition of films made by women in order to investigate the existence of a female film sensibility.

The 1972 festival took place from June 7-June 21, 1972, at the Fifth Avenue Cinema in New York. Prior to its premiere, the festival and Nordstrom faced numerous organizational challenges, postponing its starting date three times, and experiencing little coverage in the mainstream press, with Nordstrom acquiring significant personal debt to finance the festival. The festival relied upon peer-to-peer communication within New York's feminist community to advertise the festival. Despite a slow start, the festival was considered a success by many members of its audience and its organizers by its end, having a sold out final week.

The festival lineup consisted of 120 films, including 17 features, and 15 shorts programmes. Features included Mai Zetterling's The Girls, Agnès Varda's Cléo from 5 to 7, Ida Lupino's The Bigamist, Nelly Kaplan's A Very Curious Girl, Barbara Loden's Wanda, feminist writer Kate Millett's documentary Three Lives, and Leontine Sagan's Mädchen in Uniform. Shorts programmes were thematically organized under titles such as "Camaraderie," "The Feminine Mystique," "Eroticism and Exploitation," and "The Cycle of Life."

In addition to the film programmes, 10 panels were held in a nearby public high school on topics such as Editing, Acting, Directing, Female Film Aesthetics, and Male Aesthetics.

=== Second International Festival of Women's Films (1976) ===
The Second International Festival of Women's Films would not be held until 1976. The festival ran from September 13 to September 26 at the 600-seat Cinema Studio, a venue with double the capacity of the Fifth Avenue Cinema where the previous festival had been held. The festival consisted of 17 feature films, 16 shorts programmes, panel discussions and a 4-day conference.

Several films had their United States premieres at the festival. These included Rising Target, directed by Barbara Frank, Daguerréotypes, directed by Agnès Varda, Femmes Au Soleil, directed by Liliane Dreyfus, Aloïse, directed by Liliane de Kermadec, and Love Under the Crucifix, directed by Kinuyo Tanaka.

One panel discussion featured Warren Beatty, Molly Haskell, Arthur Penn, and Jeanne Moreau.

Nordstrom and co-director Leah Laiman planned to take the festival on a 10-city tour of the United States following the completion of the New York festival.

Ultimately, the second edition of the festival was seen by some critics as less successful than the first edition, being smaller in attendance, and representing less of a collective effort.

== Criticism ==
Filmmaker and video artist Joan Braderman criticized the programme of the first festival for the "haphazard collection of films," and characterized it as a "misguided attempt to find a female sensibility."

Eva Hiller and Renate Holy, reviewing the second edition of the festival in 1976 wrote that the second edition demonstrated remarkably more tension between the radical and Hollywood-friendly feminist crowds in attendance.

Both editions also faced mild criticism for their lack of inclusion of lesbian films.

== Legacy ==
Feminist scholar B. Ruby Rich cites the period from 1972 to 1973, when the festival took place as a watershed for feminist action that has not since been equalled. Within the years immediately following the first edition of the festival, numerous similarly minded festivals were established, including the Women's Event at the 1972 Edinburgh International Film Festival, organized by Lynda Myles, Laura Mulvey, and Claire Johnston, and the Toronto Women and Film Festival.

== See also ==
- List of women's film festivals
- Woman's film
