= International Women's Film Festival in Salé =

Annual film festival held in Morocco

Salé International Women's Film Festival international du film de femmes de Salé
- Begins: November 8th, 2021
- Ends: November 13th, 2021
- Frequency: Annually
- Locations: Sale, Morocco
- Country: Morocco
- Founded: 2004
- Patron: King Mohammed VI
- Website: https://www.fiffs.ma/

The International Women's Film Festival of Salé (Arabic: المهرجان الدولي لفيلم المرأة بسلا) or FIFFS, is a film festival held in Salé, Morocco.

Organized by the Bouregreg Association under the patronage of King Mohammed VI with the aim of promoting women's cinema and highlighting women in cinema, the festival was created in 2004 and was followed by a second edition in 2006. It has been an annual event since 2009 (with the exception of 2020, due to the Covid-19 pandemic).

At the first edition, the jury was made entirely of women and was presided over by Moroccan filmmaker Narjiss Nejjar.

== See also ==
- International Women's Film Festival (disambiguation)
