= Barcelona International Women's Film Festival =

Women's film festival in Barcelona, Spain

Barcelona International Women's Film Festival Mostra Films Dones Barcelona
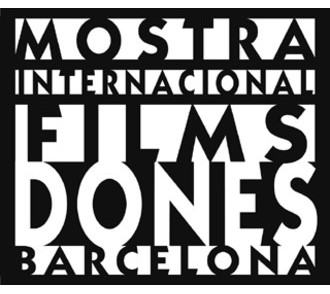
- Location: Barcelona, Catalunya, Spain
- Established: 1993
- Website: www.mostrafilmsdones.cat

Barcelona International Women's Film Festival (Spanish: Mostra Films Dones Barcelona) is an annual film festival held in Barcelona, Spain. It was established in 1993 with the aim of promoting films directed by women.

== History ==
The Barcelona International Women's Film Festival (also known as Mostra) was established in Barcelona in 1993, to promote and highlight films made by women, and to increase the visibility of women's contribution to audiovisual culture. Over twenty five years, the festival has become a cultural mainstay of the city, a launching pad for alternative creations, and a forum for discourse and debate on topics relating to women, film and the creative process.

For most of its history the festival has focused on experimental and documentary film, though it has also screened fictional work.

In 2013, the festival changed its format to include various sections, including monographs, various themes, and extra-short videos.

For the 25th anniversary edition of the festival, it launched a creative project for female artists and filmmakers, inviting participants to submit either audiovisual work, photographs, gifs or written texts, based on their cinematic influences.

== Description ==
The festival is non-competitive. It screens unreleased films directed or co-directed by women, of medium or feature length.

It is supported by sponsors, as well as municipal and national institutions, including the City of Barcelona, and the Spanish Ministry of Culture. The festival also collaborates with local and national cultural institutes. Mostra also collaborates with other women's film festivals in Spain and elsewhere, such as the Festival International de Films de Femmes de Créteil.

With year-round programming, Mostra projects work to highlight work of filmmakers from around the world, increasing the visibility of women's film culture, and showing the importance of women's contribution to audiovisual creation.

== See also ==
- List of women's film festivals
- Women's cinema
