= Another Experiment by Women Film Festival =

Film festival in New York for women's experimental films

- Location: Manhattan
- Established: 2010
- Website: axwonline.com

Another Experiment by Women Film Festival (AXW) is a film festival founded in New York City in 2010 by Lili White. AXW promotes and screens women's experimental films, many of which feature underrepresented themes and issues distinct to women and girls.

== History ==
Lili White, an avant-garde filmmaker who is a graduate of the Pennsylvania Academy of Fine Arts, was inspired to create the AXW after showing her work on a Manhattan Neighborhood Network community TV show—EYE:AM—curated by Victoria Kereszi. She was impressed by Kereszi's dedication to showing women's work, which White believed was underrepresented, and generally invisible to the public and not usually seen outside of academic or film society realms. White approached Kereszi with her the idea of creating a festival that would provide a stage for women experimental creators, and also foster a community, which she deemed both needful and lacking.

The first festival took place in the autumn of 2010, curated by White. The festival later became a Fractured Atlas Fiscally Sponsored Campaign and a recipient of a 2011 Lower Manhattan Cultural Council MCAT Arts Fund Grant.

The festival screens groupings of films in Manhattan; each grouping of films is designed to speak to a shared underlying topic. In addition to screenings, the festival organization maintains an archive, a blog and a curated list of short films available for viewing online.

== See also ==
- List of women's film festivals
- Women's cinema
