= Women's film festival =

The history of women's film festivals begins in the early 1970s during the second wave of feminism. The first international women's film festival took place in New York in 1972, and the occurrence of female film festivals soon spread to the rest of the world with festivals happening in Canada and Germany in 1973, France in 1974, and Iran in 1975. During the 1980s and the 1990s, the number of international women's film festivals increased and today there are over 100 worldwide.

== History ==
The history of women's film festivals begins in the early 1970s during the second wave of feminism. The first international women's film festival was the International Festival of Women's Films taking place in New York in June 1972. The rest of the 1970s saw the organization of numerous women's film festivals around the world. These included: The Women's Event at the Edinburgh International Film Festival (1972); The Women's Video Festival in New York (1972); The Women & Film Festival in Toronto (1973); The International Women's Film Conference in Berlin (1973); and Musidora in Paris (1974). During the 1980s and the 1990s, the number of international women's film festivals increased and today there are over 100 worldwide.

The public and professional image of a filmmaker has been shaped by years of exclusionary practices towards women. Although women make up approximately 50% of the world's population, less than 10% of directors in Hollywood are female. Between 2008 and 2022, 8.9% of film award nominations have gone to female directors. The women that are portrayed in the film industry have to fit a mold set by male writers and directors. Studies have shown that when women in films differentiate from this mold - for instance, a female character that is ambitious or focused on their career - they are portrayed and perceived negatively. Female film festivals are more open to female narratives which provides a space that is nonexistent in the film making scene internationally. Women have played a significant role in the development of the art of film throughout history, but often have not been credited. Film through a feminist lens grew in popularity throughout the 1970s and 80s, and women began to amass more power in filmmaking around this time. The gender gap in film, however, continues to be a prevalent issue. In fact, the number of women working on top-grossing films increased by only 1% from 1998 to 2022. Additionally, countries that have gender imbalance in their film industries include Germany, Austria, Poland, Ireland, Portugal, Finland, Iceland, Italy, United States, Australia, and New Zealand.

Female film festivals were created to provide a space for female directors and screenwriters to show their work in a historically male dominated industry. Popular films are mostly written by men and female characters are inaccurately depicted. Independent film and film festivals are composed of significantly more female directors and writers than commercial film. Female film festivals not only seek to showcase women's work in film, but they also aim to show movies with feminist themes that are often lacking from other cinema.

== Awards ==
Though some festivals did not include awards in their first year, most festivals now have awards ceremonies. This is where a panel of judges, composed of many local and international filmmakers and critics, come together to judge then award films according to a category.

Categories may include, but are not limited to:

- Best Picture
- Best Dramatic Film
- Best Comedic Film
- Best Original Screenplay
- Best Director
- Best Cinematography
- Best Animation
- Best Documentary
- Best Actress
- Best Editor
- Best Animated Film

Women's film festivals give out awards to support female filmmakers in continuing their work with the help of multiple organizations that sponsor these film festivals. One of the general requirements in order to participate in one of the women's film festivals would be identifying as a woman. This specific requirement is what sets women's film festivals apart from film festivals as the main objective of women's film festivals is to promote and encourage female filmmaking and feminist film criticism.

== See also ==
- List of women's film festivals
