= Beirut International Women Film Festival =

Annual film festival in Beirut, Lebanon, screening women's films

Beirut International Women Film Festival BWFF
- Location: Beirut, Lebanon
- Established: 2016
- Website: beirutwomenfilmfestival.com

Beirut International Women Film Festival (BWFF) is an annual event held in Beirut. The festival screens films made by women or centering women, and tackles issues that particularly affect women, including gender equality, sexual identity, and domestic violence.

== History ==
The festival was founded in 2016, with the theme "Women for Change", with the goal of Women's Empowerment. The symbol of the festival is the Phoenician goddess Tanith, who is a mother goddess who rules the stars and sky, symbolizing fertility and life force.

== Awards ==
National Competition:

- Best Lebanese Feature Film
- Best Lebanese Feature Documentary
- Best Lebanese Short Film
- Best Lebanese Short Documentary
- Best Lebanese Animated Film

International Competition:

- Best Foreign Language Feature Film
- Best Feature Documentary
- Best Short Film
- Best Short Documentary
- Best Animated Short Film
- Best Animated Feature Film
- Best Female Director
- Best Female Cinematographer
- Best Actress

== See also ==
- List of women's film festivals
