= Patriotic Health Campaign =

Chinese public health campaign

The Patriotic Health Campaign, first started in 1952, was a campaign aimed to improve sanitation, hygiene, as well as attack diseases in the People's Republic of China (PRC). Throughout the 1950s to the 1970s, public health campaigns were carried out throughout China targeting diseases like cholera or diarrhea, among many others. Due to high illiteracy rates, health posters were frequently used to communicate medical knowledge visually to the masses. According to historians, the health campaign was closely tied to many Chinese domestic issues during the time, such as the socialist reconstruction in China, and the Cultural Revolution.

According to multiple historians including Andrew Kuech, Milton Leitenberg, Thomas Powell, Ruth Rogaski, and Nianqun Yang, the PRC Government started the campaign after reports of germ-warfare in North Korea by the United States. While the validity of this claim is dubious, the PRC Government used them to encourage public hygiene and health work. Due to its origin, the Patriotic Health Campaign is also the origin of many Chinese propaganda posters criticizing American imperialism and its "germ-warfare".

== Legacy ==
The Patriotic Health Campaigns were discussed by Chinese leader Xi Jinping on his 70th campaign anniversary. He claimed that it had "focused on people's health and given priority to prevention, playing an important role in changing the landscape of urban and rural environment and sanitation, effectively responding to major infectious diseases, and improving the level of social health management."

Additionally, the Patriotic Health Campaigns led to the creation of the Chinese Patriotic Health Month in 1989, which aimed to promote awareness about public health.

== See also ==
- Ministry of Health
