= International Women's Film Festival (Australia) =

1975 festival

The International Women's Film Festival (IWFF) was a one-off film festival focusing on women's issues and films made by women, run in several capital cities of Australia in 1975.

== Background ==
During the early 1970s, there was a growing feminist movement in Australia, and women's cinema gained prominence. The role of women's films was discussed at the Women's Liberation Conference in Melbourne in 1970. Groups such as the Sydney Women's Film Group (SWFG) and Reel Women in Melbourne were established. A number of filmmakers, including Jeni Thornley, Sarah Gibson, Susan Lambert, Martha Ansara, Margot Nash, (Note: As of 2018 screenwriter and director, faculty at UTS) and Megan McMurchy collaborated and explored ideas related to women by creating stories in film.

Owing to poor distribution by commercial distributors, feminist films were shown by film societies, educational institutions, community groups and film festivals across Australia and the world.

In 1974, ahead of International Women's Year in 1975, a group of around 20 women submitted a proposal to the Film and Television board of the Australia Council for the Arts, providing a list of reasons as to why a women's film festival was necessary. These included:

- To provide historical and cultural context of women's cinema
- To allow women to explore their creativity through films
- To counterbalance the lack of distribution of women's films in Australia
- To provide more exposure for Australian films made by women
- To explore the iconography and cinematic language used by women in their films
- To examine "women's culture" and develop a feminist perspective in the critique of women's films

== The festival ==
As a protest at the low number of women filmmakers featured in the Sydney Film Festival, the Sydney Women's Film Group (SWFG) organises the International Women's Film Festival.

From September 1974, groups in each state worked towards creating a film festival, and in January and February 1975, two women from the coordinating group went to Europe and America to negotiate for films that they wanted to show.

The International Women's Film Festival, which was the first of its kind in Australia, ran from August to October in 1975, in every state capital city, and Canberra (Australian Capital Territory). In Melbourne and Sydney the festivals ran for nine days (with an audience of around 56,000), and in the other states they spanned two to three days. The festival was devoted to films by and for women, and was tied to the International Women's Year movement.

Jeni Thornley, Margot Oliver, Pat Longmore and Sue Johnston were all part of the original organising group in Sydney, while Suzanne Spunner was co-ordinator of the Melbourne event, which screened at the historic Palais Theatre.

== Legacy ==
The festival inspired women filmmakers around the country and empowered activists, helped build momentum for the Australian Women's Liberation Movement, and was the first event that demonstrated that women audiences existed as a distinct group.

It also enabled networking for women in various art, theatre and film groups, who later collaborated. Out of these meetings arose LIP, a feminist arts magazine founded by Spunner in 1976.

The Melbourne Women in Film Festival (MWIFF), launched in 2017, "inherited the aims and intentions of the original 1975 International Women’s Film Festival". The inaugural event included a keynote panel on which several of the original organisers of the IWFF were panellists, and ran a shorts program screening some of the rare films from the IWFF.
