= Home Movie (2016 film) =

2016 documentary film by Caroline Pick

- Directed by: Caroline Pick
- Written by: Caroline Pick
- Produced by: Penny Woolcock
- Narrated by: Caroline Pick
- Cinematography: Jirka Pick
- Edited by: Alex Fry
- Music by: Alex Fry Rob Manning
- Release date: 2016
- Running time: 18 minutes
- Countries: UK; Czech Republic; France
- Language: English

Home Movie is a 2016 short documentary biographical film, written and directed by Caroline Pick.

== Synopsis ==
For over 50 years, home movies filmed by Caroline Pick's father lay unnoticed in a wardrobe. Pick, now over 60 years old, finds them while clearing it out during a house move. Her father filmed the reels in Czechoslovakia and the UK, and when she does go through them, she is exposed to things her parents kept secret, hints about the family's past, lost relatives, and other things they were silent about. She embarks on a journey to fill in the gaps, as she compares and contrasts the happy images of the family in 1950s Cardiff and 1930s Europe, which belie the tragedies that lie behind the smiles. What the film discovers and concludes is a dark and secret doom, relating to immigration, dislocation and death.

== Awards ==
- 2015: Women Over 50 Film Festival – Best Documentary

== Official festival screenings ==
- San Francisco Jewish Film Festival
- Berlin Jewish Film Festival
- Toronto Jewish Film Festival
- Jerusalem Jewish Film Festival
- New York Jewish Film Festival
- London Short Film Festival
- Open City DocFest
- UK Jewish Film Festival
- Cinecity Brighton Film Festival
