= Li Dan (activist) =

Chinese activist

- 李丹
- Born: 1978 or 1979 (age 47–48)
- Education: Beijing Normal University

Li Dan (Chinese: 李丹, born 1978) is a Chinese HIV/AIDS activist.

== Life ==
Li was born in 1978 or 1979 and grew up in Beijing. He pursued a PhD in astrophysics at the Chinese Academy of Sciences, although he stopped his studies in 2002 or 2003, choosing to focus instead on activism.

He is the founder and chairman of the China Women's Film Festival (中国国际女性影展).

Li was a member of the Chinese Communist Party's youth league.

=== HIV/AIDS activism ===
Li first became involved in HIV/AIDS activism in 1996, his freshman year at Beijing Normal University. As a member of the student Red Cross Society, he helped give out pamphlets on AIDS for World AIDS Day (December 1). However, he did not become fully aware of the stigma of HIV/AIDS until 1998, when he saw the 1993 film Philadelphia. He began working with activist Wan Yanhai, and, after learning of an HIV outbreak in Henan, Li began volunteering in the region. In 2002, he filmed a documentary about the HIV/AIDS in one village in Henan, and gave the footage to the Health Ministry. He was subsequently interrogated by police after he also shared the footage with journalists.

In June 2003, Li established Dongzhen (lit. Eastern Treasure), a school and orphanage for children whose parents were HIV positive or whose parents had died from AIDS in Shangqiu, Henan, housed in a local mosque. By October 2003, they were teaching 23 children. The school attracted media attention and a number of donations. In February 2004, Li met with local authorities about permits to run a private school, and was told he needed to raise about US$120,000. In March 2004, authorities shut down the school, with the students moved to other orphanages. After several months of negotiations, Li registered Dongzhen as a private business, and was permitted to resume classes in late June. In early July, the mosque evicted the school, citing pressure against the school, and Dongzhen relocated to a nearby dormitory. The following day, Li left for a meeting with other HIV/AIDS activists in Thailand. While Li was away, authorities shut down the school again and arrested a couple who had been strong supporters of the school. The couple were released on 7 August. Over the course of August, Li was assaulted twice and was threatened by a large group of men. In a final attempt to salvage the school, Li accepted authorities' demands to draft an apology letter to Shangqiu leaders, change the school's name, and cut off contact with the media.

He was the recipient of the Reebok Human Rights Award in 2006.

In 2007, Li co-founded the Korekata AIDS Law Center with Shen Tingting.

By 2007 and until at least 2009, Li was noted as being the director of the China Orchid Project, an organization to serve AIDS orphans. In July 2007, Li was held in custody in Beijing for 24 hours after the project was a co-organizer of a planned conference on HIV/AIDS and the law.

== See also ==
- HIV/AIDS in China
