= Mumbai Women's International Film Festival =

- Location: Mumbai, India
- Festival date: Annual event
- Language: International
- Website: http://www.mwiff.com/

Mumbai Women's International Film Festival (MWIFF) is an annual film festival in Mumbai, India featuring films made by women directors and women technicians, and is one of the significant film festivals in Asia.

It is organised by Oculus Creations (A division of Dolphins Interactive Sciences Pvt.Ltd) which is run by a group of young media professionals and entrepreneurs, it also organised the Mumbai International Short Film Festival (MISFF) 2012.

== History ==
The first edition of MWIFF was held in Mumbai from 8 to 14 October 2013. In its first edition the festival received around 450 films from which around 250 films were screened at different theatres in Mumbai. The festival had 7 categories namely Short Films, Documentary Films, PSA (Public Service Announcement), Feature Films, World Cinebuster, World Panorama and World premiere to exhibit the works of the creative minds and give them a platform. The festival had launched the first ‘Fatma Begum’ Award in the name of the first women director of India. It also introduced the ‘Pink Carpet’ ceremony instead of the regular Red Carpet ceremony. MWIFF 2013 had screened the films of top-notch Bollywood female directors which included ‘English Vinglish’ by Gauri Shinde; ‘You Don't Get Life a Second Time’ by Zoya Akhtar; Om Shanti Om by Farah Khan; Dhobighat by Kiran Rao; Talaash by Reema Kagti and Firaaq by Nandita Das.Since its inception the festival received a lot of appreciation for its initiatives. It was considered to be the biggest women's film festival in India. The festival honoured actor-director Nandita Das, choreographer Saroj Khan, singer Shibani Kashyap, director Reema Kagti and Shaban Azmi. The festival had also conducted Masterclass and interactive session by industry professionals like writer Kamlesh Pandey, actor Nawazuddin Siddiqui, writer and actor Piyush Mishra, Director Alankrita Srivastava and director Barnali Ray Shukla on various topics of cinema.

The second Mumbai Women's International Film Festival (MWIFF) was held from 6 to 13 December 2014 in Mumbai at the 67-year-old historical venue, Liberty Cinema.

== Highlights ==
Open Air Screening, film conference, networking parties, seminars and interactive sessions on important topics of cinema are held at the festival. The festival focuses mainly on women in filmmaking. MWIFF in its first edition had a film category – ‘PSA’ completely for women that had films based on theme – ‘social cause of women’. The festival has this year introduced a Social campaign and film category – ‘City for Women’ to showcase films that depicts the bond between women and the city – ‘Mumbai’

== See also ==
- List of women's film festivals
