= Bahamas International Film Festival =

Film festival in the Bahamas

- Location: Various
- Founded: 2004
- Language: English and others
- Website: www.bintlfilmfest.com

The Bahamas International Film Festival (BIFF) is a non-profit film festival held in the Bahamas. Open to both locals and international visitors, the festival was founded by Leslie Vanderpool in 2004.

BIFF also hosts a youth film workshop that aims to provide young Bahamians with information and resources on filmmaking.

The 2015 BIFF showcased several women-driven films such as Carol and Janis: Little Girl Blue.

BIFF was listed among the 25 coolest film festivals in the world by MovieMaker Magazine.

== Awards ==
The following is a list of awards given at the Bahamas International Film Festival.

=== Grand Jury ===
Year	New Visions	Spirit of Freedom Narrative	Spirit of Freedom Documentary	Short Film	Special Mention(s)
2004	Modern Maverick Award: Love Me If You Dare; Yann Samuell (France) (Belgium); Torchlight Award: Dorian Blues; Tennyson Bardwell (United States)	20 Fingers; Mania Akbari (Iran)			Whisky Romeo Zulu (Argentina); Roger Corman
2005	Antibodies; Christian Alvart (Germany)	Zozo; Josef Fares (Sweden) (Lebanon) (Denmark) (United Kingdom) (Czech Republic) (Netherlands)	La sierra Scott Dalton, Margarita Martinez (Colombia) (United States)		
2006	Half Nelson; Ryan Fleck (United States)	Chronicle of an Escape; Adrián Caetano (Argentina)	Encounter Point; Ronit Avni, Julia Bacha (Palestine) (United States)		Premium (United States)
2007	I'm Through with White Girls; Jennifer Sharp (United States)	In the Valley of Elah; Paul Haggis (United States)	Iron Ladies of Liberia; Daniel Junge, Siatta Scott Johnson (Liberia) (South Africa) (United States)	Rose; Hoku Uchiyama (United States)	
2008	Cold Lunch; Eva Sørhaug (Norway)	Lion's Den; Pablo Trapero (Argentina) (South Korea) (Brazil) (Spain)	Youssou N'Dour: I Bring What I Love; Elizabeth Chai Vasarhelyi (Senegal) (France) (Egypt) (United States)	Gone Fishing; Chris Jones (United Kingdom)	
2010	Hello Lonesome; Adam Reid (United States)	The Athlete; Davey Frankel, Rasselas Lakew (Ethiopia)	Budrus; Julia Bacha (Palestine) (United States)	Contact Zone; Gustavius Smith (The Bahamas)	
2011	Restless City; Andrew Dosunmu (United States)	VIPs; Toniko Melo (Brazil)	Marathon Boy; Gemma Atwal (United Kingdom) (India)	Homecoming; Gursimran Sandhu (United States)	Better Mus' Come (Jamaica); Zero Percent (United States)
2012	Maybe Tomorrow; Michael Wolfe (United States)	Between Us; Dan Mirvish (United States)	Mulberry Child; Susan Morgan Cooper (United States)	Brigidy Bram; Toby Lunn, Laura Gamse (The Bahamas)	Apartment in Athens (Italy) (Germany); Baseball in the Time of Cholera (Haiti)
2014	Leave to Remain; Bruce Goodison (United Kingdom)	Wheels; Donavon Thomas (United States)	Poverty, Inc. Michael Matheson Miller (United States)	Perfect Day; Derrick L. Sanders (United States)	Tobacco Burn (United States); In the Clouds (Argentina)
2015	Somewhere in the Middle; Lanre Olabisi (United States)	Showing Roots; Michael Wilson (United States)	India's Daughter; Leslee Udwin (United Kingdom)	More Than God; Kev Cahill (Republic of Ireland)	A Beautiful Now (United States); Terra Incognita (Brazil)
2016	Live Cargo; Logan Sandler (The Bahamas) (United States)	9 Rides; Matthew A. Cherry (United States)	The House on Coco Road; Damani Baker (Grenada) (United States)	Replika; Luc Walpoth (Switzerland)	
2017	Interlude; Bernard Tanguy (France)	Liyana; Aaron Kopp, Amanda Kopp (Eswatini) (United States) (Qatar)	My Enemy, My Brother; Ann Shin (Canada)	Owen; Kelly Pike (United States)	I Am Shakespeare: The Henry Green Story (United States)
2018	Sprinter; Storm Saulter (Jamaica) (United States)	Capernaum; Nadine Labaki (Lebanon)	Wrestle; Suzannah Herbert (United States)	Lalo's House; Kelley Kali (Haiti) (United States)	Ovum (United States)
2019	Quest: The Truth Always Rises; Santiago Rizzo (United States)	Doing Money; Lynsey Miller (United Kingdom)	The Remix: Hip Hop X Fashion; Lisa Cortés, Farah X (United States)	The Wind Phone; Kristen Gerweck (United States)	Black Hat (United States); Night Song (Hungary); Silence (United Kingdom)
2021	Jumbo; Zoé Wittock (France) (Belgium) (Luxembourg)	Small Time; Niav Conty (United States)	My Blood is Red; Thiago Dezan, Graciela Guarani, Marcelo Vogelaar (Brazil) (United Kingdom)	Ashmina; Dekel Berenson (Nepal)	Three Blades (Haiti)

=== Audience awards ===
Year	Best Narrative	Best Documentary
2004	One Love; Rick Elgood, Don Letts (Jamaica) (United Kingdom) (Norway)	Tibet: Cry of the Snow Lion; Tom Peosay (United States)
2006	Johnny Slade's Greatest Hits; Larry Blamire (United States)	Eleutheran Adventure; Kareem Mortimer (The Bahamas)
2010	The Athlete; Davey Frankel, Rasselas Lakew (Ethiopia)	Bouncing Cats; Nabil Elderkin (United States) (Uganda)
2011	Better Mus' Come; Storm Saulter (Jamaica)	On The Wings of Men; Calvin Dwight Harris (The Bahamas)
2012	The Story of Luke; Alonso Mayo (United States) (Peru)	Rising From Ashes; T.C. Johnstone (Rwanda) (South Africa) (United Kingdom) (United States)

=== First Look ===
Year	Best Feature	Best Short	Special Mention(s)
2011	Amos Ferguson: Match Me If You Can; Karen Arthur, Thomas Neuwirth (The Bahamas)	Five Bones; K. Tyler Johnston (The Bahamas)	Tall Tale of An Accidental Tourist (The Bahamas)

=== Honors ===
Bahamian Tribute Award

- 2009: Gavin McKinney

Career Achievement Award

- 2005: Spike Lee
- 2006: Nicolas Cage
- 2007: Daryl Hannah
- 2008: Laurence Fishburne
- 2009: Johnny Depp
- 2011: Heather Graham
- 2013: Danny Glover
- 2017: Grace Jones

Rising Star Honoree

- 2007: Naomie Harris
- 2008: Anna Faris
- 2009: Sophie Okonedo
- 2011: Zoë Kravitz

Shining Star Tribute

- 2012: Sydney Tamiia Poitier
- 2014: Debra Messing
- 2017: Michael K. Williams

Sir Sidney Poitier Tribute Award

- 2016: Cicely Tyson

Tribute Award

- 2014: Chaz Ebert
