= Kareem Roustom =

Syrian-American composer

Kareem Roustom كريم رستم
- Born: Damascus, Syria
- Genres: Contemporary classical music
- Occupation(s): composer, musician, university teacher
- Instrument: oud
- Years active: 2001–present
- Website: https://kr-music.com/

Kareem Roustom (Arabic: كريم رستم) is a Syrian-American composer, music director, and university teacher, noted mainly for his compositions of contemporary classical music, film scores and his collaboration with pop music artists. Among other musical ensembles, his compositions have been performed by the BBC Symphony Orchestra, the Boston Symphony Orchestra, the New York Philharmonic Orchestra and at festivals in the U.S., the Middle East and in Europe.

== Biography ==
Roustom was born in 1971 in Damascus to an American mother and a Syrian father and moved with his family to the U.S. as a teenager. He first attended the Northeastern University program in electrical engineering in 1989 and later earned a Bachelor of Arts in Music Business and Music Performance from the University of Massachusetts at Lowell in 1993. From 2004 to 2006, Roustom continued with an M.A. in Ethnomusicology and Composition at Tufts University. His thesis dealt with oud improvisations of notable Egyptian composer and musician Riad Al Sunbati.

Since September 2017, Roustom is Professor of the Practice at the music department of Tufts University, School of Arts and Sciences, where he teaches orchestration, music notation, Music of the Middle East and composition for film. He is also director of the university's Arabic Music Ensemble.

== Artistic career ==
Roustom started playing guitar and the Arabic oud before becoming a composer of contemporary classical music. His compositions have been crossing musical genres: Among others, his music has been commissioned by conductor Daniel Barenboim and the West-Eastern Divan Orchestra, the Kronos Quartet, and the British choreographer Shobana Jeyasingh. Further, he has written musical arrangements for pop musicians Shakira and Tina Turner, as well as film scores for movies. His music has been performed at festivals and concert venues, including the BBC Proms, the Salzburg Festival, the Lucerne Festival, the Carnegie Hall, the Pierre Boulez Hall and the Teatro Colon.

Roustom's music has been characterized as "rooted in two worlds", with references to both Western and Middle Eastern literary and musical traditions. His clarinet concerto Adrift on the Wine-dark Sea was composed in 2017 for fellow Syrian-American musician Kinan Azmeh and the Deutsches Symphony Orchestra. In composing this work, Roustom was inspired both by Homer’s Odyssey and by the fate of Syrian refugee Doaa Al-Zamel, as "both embark on a perilous sea journey in an attempt to reach home, or a place of refuge." Hurry to the Light, his 2009 composition for string orchestra and vocal ensemble was also inspired by the Odyssey and premiered by A Far Cry chamber orchestra and Lorelei Ensemble in Boston.

His Violin Concerto No. 1 is an homage to Mozart’s historical interest in Arabic and Turkish music. It had its world premiere in 2019, with Michael Barenboim on solo violin and the Barenboim-Said Academy's Boulez Ensemble, conducted by Lahav Shani in Berlin.

In July 2022, British choreographer Shobana Jeyasingh presented her work Clorinda Agonistes - Clorinda the Warrior, a hybrid opera with dance and video projections, at Sadler's Wells Theatre in London and other venues. In the first act, this work follows Claudio Monteverdi's 1624 operatic cantata, Il combattimento di Clorinda e Tancredi, whose story is based on Torquato Tasso's poem Jerusalem Liberated and set in times of the crusades in medieval Jerusalem. To this historical piece, Jeyasingh added Roustom's contemporary music in a second act, using Monteverdi's baroque instrumental textures and rhythms as "points of departure." Both compositions were played live by a string quartet, with tenor Ed Lyon singing the leading parts. Further musical elements chosen by Roustom were the Middle Eastern social dance dabke and the recorded voice of Syrian mezzo-soprano Dima Orsho singing in Arabic."

My response to Monteverdi was to use the same text that he used - Tasso's poem 'Jerusalem Liberated'. I chose specific lines that, in a new context and sung in Arabic, could express new meanings. By giving Clorinda this text in Arabic, I feel that we are empowering her and freeing her to be her true self. The other text that Dima Orsho sings is a 1000-year-old poem which the Baghdadi poet Al-Abiwardi wrote after the Crusaders had sacked Jerusalem. Al-Abiwardi excoriates the Baghdad leadership that idly sat by while the Crusaders took Jerusalem. It is quite striking how relevant this poem is today.

— Kareem Roustom,

== Selected works ==
Compositions

- Four Dances from Clorinda Agonistes for string quartet, (2021)
- Hurry to the Light for string orchestra and vocal ensemble (2019)
- Violin Concerto No. 1 for violin & chamber orchestra, (2019)
- String Quartet No. 1: Shades of Night, (2018)
- Clarinet concerto Adrift on the Wine-dark Sea, (2017)
- Tesserae for brass quintet, (2015)
- A Voice Exclaiming for triple string quartet, (2013)
- Traces for clarinet, piano and string quartet, (2013 rev. 2018)
- Resonances for Arabic violin, solo cello, hand percussion and string quartet, (2011)
- Abu Jmeel's Daughter for narrator, flute, clarinet, violin, viola and cello, (2011)
- Buhur for clarinet, violin, viola and cello, (2008)
- classical Arabic Music compositions for oud, percussion and mixed ensemble, (2005/2008)

Publication

- Roustom, Kareem (2014-04-18). "Michel Legrand Scores Une femme est une femme". In Tom Conley and T. Jefferson Kline (ed.). A Companion to Jean-Luc Godard. Oxford, UK: John Wiley & Sons, Ltd. pp. 71–88. doi:10.1002/9781118586815.ch5. ISBN 9781118586815.

== Movie soundtracks ==
Roustom has composed music for several movies, among others Shadow Glories (Ziad H. Hamzeh, 2001), Encounter Point (Ronit Avni, Julia Bacha, 2006), Amreeka (Cherien Dabis, 2009), Budrus (Julia Bacha, 2010), The Iran Job (Till Schauder, 2012) May in the Summer (Cherien Dabis, 2013) and Speed Sisters (Amber Fares, 2015).

== Selected awards ==
- ASCAP/Alice Parker Award for Coro Allegro's premiere of Roustom's oratorio The Son of Man, 2012
- Emmy Award nominee Music & Sound (News & Documentary), 2010
- Sundance Institute Film Composers Lab Fellowship, 2010
- Composers Assistance Program Award from the American Music Center, 2010
- Best Musical Score Award, Bend International Film Festival, 2006
- Subito Grant, American Composers Forum, 2002 - 2000
- Pete Carpenter Fellowship, BMI Foundation, Inc. 1997
