= Women in the First Intifada =

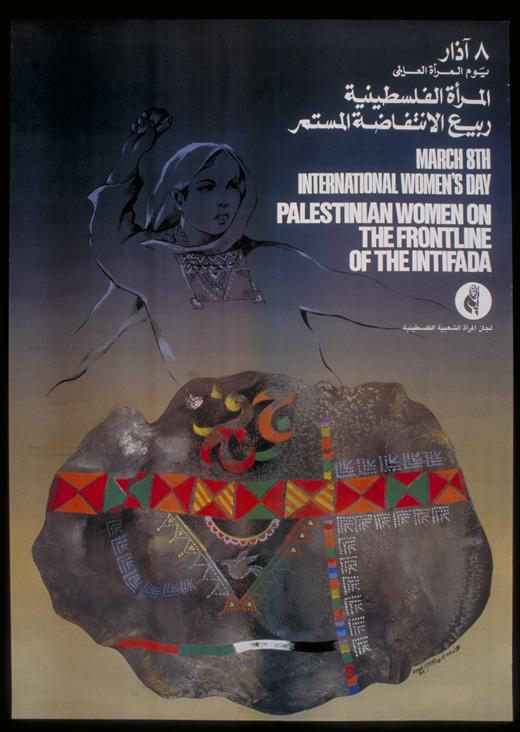
1980s PFLP poster for International Women's Day celebrating the role of women in the First Intifada.

Palestinian women played significant roles in leading and organising the First Intifada, from 1987 to 1991. Xanthe Scharff of Foreign Policy wrote that the First Intifada was a "largely nonviolent Palestinian struggle" that was "a collective social, economic, and political mobilisation led by women." Nahla Abdo of Queen's University at Kingston wrote that the Intifada "combines the trajectories of two movements: a national liberation movement and a women's movement."

== Background ==
On 9 December 1987, an Israeli truck driver collided with and killed four Palestinians in the Jabalia refugee camp. The incident sparked a wave of protests across the Occupied Palestinian Territories, which the Israeli government responded to forcefully, with Minister of Defence Yitzhak Rabin pledging to use "force, might, and beatings" to suppress the protests and ordering Israeli soldiers to break the bones of protesting Palestinians. The Israeli response sparked further protests, which quickly developed into the largest wave of demonstrations, strikes, boycotts, and civil disobedience by Palestinians since Israel captured the West Bank and Gaza Strip during the Six-Day War in 1967. This wave, which was largely non-violent, especially in its early stages, became known as the First Intifada.

== Leadership and organisation ==
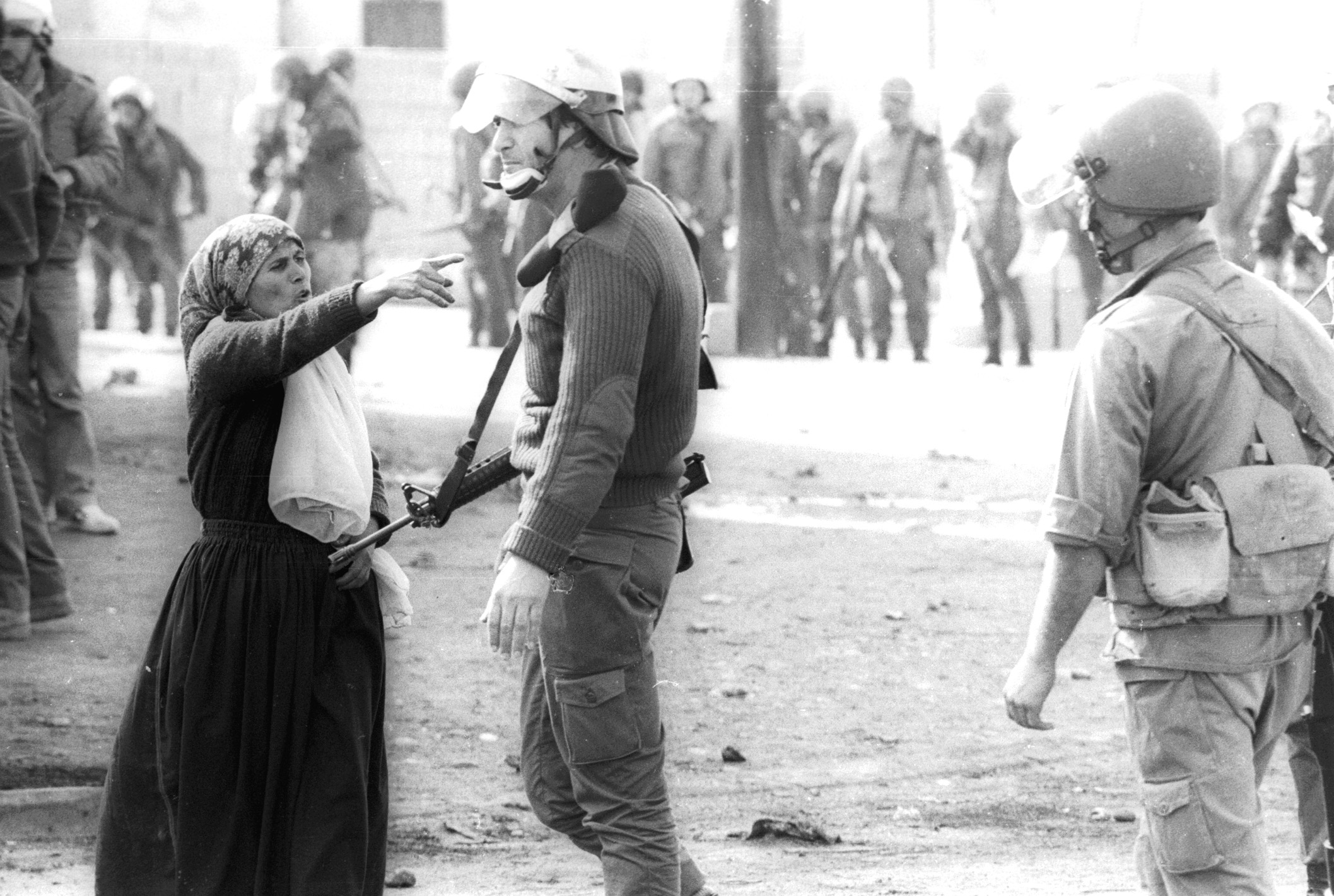
Palestinian protestor in December 1987

According to Jennifer Mogannam of the University of California, Santa Cruz, Palestinian women from the 1960s to the 1980s "largely mobilised through the General Union of Palestinian Women as well as the various political parties and PLO unions," which formed a Palestinian nationalist movement that was "consolidated under the PLO, one united infrastructure that housed political parties, popular resistance unions, guerrilla organizations, and executive infrastructures that moved forward a united project and strategy of liberation" that "subscribed to the framework that Palestine must be liberated before women can be liberated." By 1987, however, most of the mostly male PLO leadership had been exiled, imprisoned, or killed by the Israeli military. When the First Intifada broke out, it took place without much direct involvement of the PLO leadership, instead being organised and led by the grassroots organisations of the PLO, including trade unions, student unions, and community collectives, many of which were led by women, as well as by women's committees, many of which had been created in the late 1970s and early 1980s.

The leading role that women played in the Intifada were remarked upon by the news media early during the uprising. In March 1988, Joel Greenberg of The Jerusalem Post noted "the increasingly prominent role of women in Palestinian demonstrations, and the problems soldiers have in confrontations with them," saying that "soldiers are apparently under orders to show greater restraint when confronting women, but this seemed to be exploited by the women, who repeatedly baited the troops in front of several television crews." In November 1989, the New Zealand Press Association wrote that "Palestinian women are winning higher social status because of their vital, front-line role."

Women at the heads of Palestinian grassroots committees would play leading roles in organising many of the civil disobedience actions during the First Intifada, including labour strikes, general strikes, tax strikes, boycotts of Israeli goods, the distribution of pamphlets, raising of Palestinian flags, sit-ins, and demonstrations. Women would also play leading roles in establishing parallel institutions outside of Israeli control, including underground classrooms, clinics, and farming collectives. According to Mersiha Gadzo of Al Jazeera, "every major Palestinian faction formed a women’s committee, disguised as a homemaking group. Since it was illegal to be a member of any political party and student union, these women’s committees called for knitting, sewing and cooking meet-ups in public, but secretly their meetings consisted of planning the Intifada."

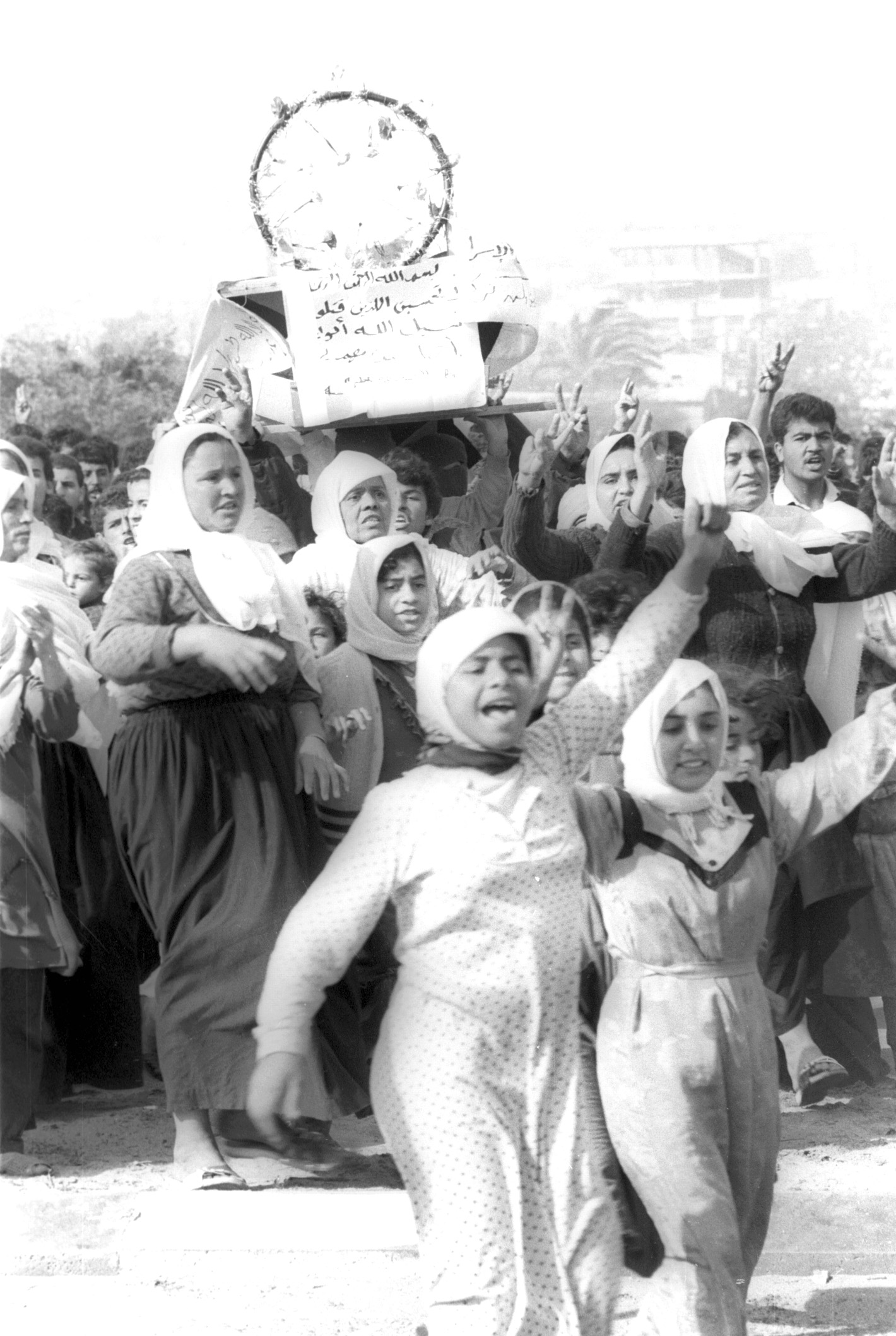
Palestinian protestors in December 1987

50-to-65% of young women in the Occupied Palestinian Territories participated in demonstrations during the Intifada. Raja Mustafa, who was 16 years old at the time of the First Intifada, was quoted by Al Jazeera in 2015 as saying "all the girls my age fought in the first Intifada; we were in the streets throwing rocks and blocking roads and screaming at the protests just like the men. Really, from the start to the finish women were participating." Khitam Saafin, head of the Union of Palestinian Women's Committees, was quoted by Al Jazeera in 2017 as saying that "women also succeeded in preventing Israeli forces from arresting youth and children; they would fearlessly attack the soldiers and pull the child or young man away by force, so they were able to escape their clutches."

The Israeli government reacted harshly to the grassroots committees and parallel institutions, as part of the iron fist policy of suppressing the Intifada, declaring them illegal and arresting those who participated in them. The Israeli government was also caught off guard by the breakout of the Intifada and the role of women during the uprising, with Naila Ayesh, a prominent organiser of the Intifada, stating that "the mentality of the Israelis was that only men participate. They didn’t think that these women were active."

== Culture and media ==
=== During the First Intifada ===
According to Christina Hazboun of Middle East Eye, "the period of the first Intifada in the late 1980s witnessed a revival and documentation of folkloric songs" that had been "largely preserved by women singers and story tellers, who were often uprooted from their villages and whose names may now be destined to oblivion." According to Wafa Ghnaim of the Metropolitan Museum of Art, during the First Intifada, "women responded to severe curfews, increased home demolitions, and the banning of the Palestinian flag by embroidering explicitly nationalistic motifs onto their dresses using the colors of the flag: red, black, white, and green. For the first time, tatreez ornamenting the thobe included men wearing the keffiyeh scarf and slinging rocks, protest chants in calligraphic script, and the borders of historic Palestine."

=== After the First Intifada ===
Portrayals of the First Intifada in international media and research have mostly overlooked the role that women played. In 2017, Fatah leader in the Occupied Territories during the uprising Zahira Kamal has stated that "in the media, the First Intifada was mainly about children throwing stones, and even more it is the frustrations that are on the ground... But it is not about the real story of the daily life of people. And the role of women in daily life in the Intifada — the political and social role — this has not been documented anywhere." In a 2011 paper, Justin D. Martin of the American University in Cairo stated that "little to no mass communication research has focused specifically on portrayals of Palestinian women during the struggle."

In 2017, the documentary film Naila and the Uprising was released, focusing on the stories of several Palestinian women who played prominent leadership roles during the First Intifada. The documentary's director Julia Bacha stated that "just like with movements for justice the world over, women’s involvement is far too often overlooked," saying that "women played monumental roles sustaining the uprising."

== Israeli women and the First Intifada ==
=== Peace activism ===
The First Intifada was also marked by an increase in collaboration between Israeli women peace activists and Palestinian women. Valérie Pouzol of Paris 8 University Vincennes-Saint-Denis wrote that, while Israeli women were largely a minority voice in opposition to the 1982 Israeli invasion of Lebanon, the outbreak of the First Intifada "propelled women’s groups opposed to the military occupation onto the public stage," adding that meeting between Israeli and Palestinian feminists during the Intifada "were particularly important for the Israeli participants as they discovered the power of Palestinian women from the territories and, in particular, their feminist convictions. For both sides, these groups represented places where they learnt about activism, places where public opinion was confronted, sometimes violently. Above all, they represented places for empowerment, where some developed a feminist conscience."

Israeli feminist Rachel Ostrowitz wrote that the Intifada "has given us the chance to re-evaluate our thoughts about the occupation, the militaristic society we live in and the fact that our voice as women is missing in go vernment and in the political world," describing several solidarity actions that Israeli feminists took, such as attempting to visit Palestinian refugee camps to meet with Palestinian activists (sometimes being blocked by the Israeli military), publicising information about human rights abuses committed by the military against Palestinians, the knitting of the Peace Quilt, and establishment of new organisations, such as Women in Black, an anti-war movement founded by women in Jerusalem. Other Israeli women's peace groups that emerged during the First Intifada included Bat Shalom, the Women's Organization for Political Prisoners, and Shani — Israeli Women Against the Occupation.

Naomi Chazan of the Hebrew University of Jerusalem stated in March 1989 that opinions polls of Israelis found that Israeli women were significantly more likely to support direct negotiations with the PLO than Israeli men, and significantly less likely to support the Israeli nuclear weapons programme. In late December 1989, a women's peace march was held in Jerusalem titled "1990: Time for Peace," with participation of over 3000 women, including several Palestinians and other non-Israeli women. The march was forcibly dispersed by Israeli police, using tear gas and batons, after one of the protestors raised a Palestinian flag, with sixteen of the protestors arrested including Italian Member of the European Parliament Dacia Valent.

According to Simona Sharoni of the American University, "the magnitude of women’s political organising triggered a serious backlash within Israeli society. Women involved in various peace initiatives, especially Women in Black, became targets for verbal and sometimes physical abuse that was almost always laced with both sexual and sexist innuendo." Sharoni further stated that the Israeli women's peace movement grew divided following the Oslo Accords in 1993, with the Accords being "interpreted by some women peace activists as an opportunity to become at last part of the Israeli national consensus" and "some women are convinced that the Oslo accords are a step toward a comprehensive peace, others argue that they perpetuate Israeli domination of Palestinians." According to Irit Halperin of Lesley University, the First Intifada "had been a time of empowerment and creation of alliances between female Israeli and Palestinian peace activists," but ultimately "the different internal political processes of each society resulted in the separation of the two groups. The Israeli women peace activists began to conclude that they did not need to connect national identity with the peace activism agenda, whereas the Palestinian women peace activists made their national agenda a top priority."

=== Israel Defense Forces ===
According to Martin van Creveld of the Hebrew University of Jerusalem, the Israeli occupation of Southern Lebanon that began in 1982 and was still active at the time of the First Intifada had created significant internal turmoil within the Israel Defense Forces, comparing it to the American War in Vietnam, turmoil which was amplified by the First Intifada and "the repeated spectacle of Israeli troops beating up women and children." van Creveled stated that the IDF was "taken by surprise" by the Intifada, and "found it difficult to cope... discipline was undermined, its self-respect diminished, and its morale reduced to the point that, of every 11 reservists, only 2 still bother to present themselves. To quote chief of staff Lieutenant General Shachak, the organization which used to be the pride of the nation was turned into a 'punching bag'." Between the mid-1980s and late 1990s, however, the number of women officers increased significantly in the IDF, and a number of new military roles were opened to women.

== Aftermath ==
By the time the First Intifada ended in 1991, over 1300 Palestinians had been killed by Israeli forces, with 120 000 injured, and tens of thousands more having been arrested at least once during the uprising, some of whom were tortured in Israeli detention. Several hundred Palestinians were killed by Palestinian internal political violence, particularly in the later stages of the uprising, and around 200 Israelis had been killed by Palestinians, mostly military personnel.

=== Women's status and organising post-Intifada ===
The advances women made in Palestinian society were not necessarily sustained after the First Intifada, and women's roles were sometimes rolled back to a worse position than they had previously been. According to Justin D. Martin of the American University in Cairo, "some men, particularly in conservative areas of the Gaza Strip, resented female activism and sought to repress it" during the First Intifada, leading to a conservative backlash during the 1990s.

According to Fadwa Allabadi of Al-Quds University, the post-First Intifada period in the early 1990s saw the emergence of new forms of Palestinian women's organising, notably through women's NGOs and research centres, as well as the rise of Islamic feminism and of a Palestinian nationalism centred around Islamic heritage. Allabadi stated that, beginning in the late 1980s, "patriarchal elements in the society began to attack women’s political involvement and their presence on the streets by restoring disciplinary practices grounded in customary and traditional norms and taboos," while during the 1990s, "secularism and leftist politics declined overall and the number of women interested in politics decreased. This is because the frustration at the failure of the peace talks, as mentioned earlier, caused the number of women mobilized in the political parties to decline, and many women also gave up their activities in grassroots organizations." In a 1991 article in The New York Times, Sabra Chartrand stated that there had been a significant increase in women wearing hijabs since the start of the First Intifada, particularly in the Gaza Strip, with many Palestinians having "adopted Islam and its rituals as a focus for the Palestinian cause, a source of ethnic pride and an alternative to the failures of secular political movements" even as "people close to events in Gaza say Palestinians here have not become more religious."

=== Peace process ===
As a result of the First Intifada, peace negotiations in the Israeli-Palestinian conflict increased significantly in the early 1990s, first with the Madrid Conference of 1991. In the Madrid Conference, the Palestinian negotiating team included two women, Hanan Ashrawi and Zahira Kamal, with no women initially in the Israeli team, before one woman later joined. Suad Amiry would also join the Palestinian negotiating team. Palestinian women would also compose the Document of Principles on Women’s Legal Status during the early 1990s. The Oslo Accords negotiations would then follow in 1993, where the Israeli government began directly negotiating with the PLO for the first time.

However, the Oslo peace negotiations were largely led by high-ranking male PLO members who had been living in exile, without much participation of the grassroots and female leadership that had led the Intifada. Farrah Koutteineh of the Palestinian Return Centre wrote that the Oslo negotiations "were secretly launched by all-male PLO officials abroad who had no part to play in the intifada, who exploited Palestinian women’s tireless efforts, and signed an agreement which has worsened the lives of Palestinians to this very day." In the 2017 documentary Naila and the Uprising, Palestinian activist during the First Intifada Naima Al-Sheikh Ali stated that:

"Women were left out of all preparations for the formation of the Palestinian Authority. We represent 50 percent of society, sometimes more. If 50 percent of the population isn’t participating in decisions, that means society is half-paralyzed. When you compare what we proposed to what came out of Oslo, you get truly sad. Because Oslo brought a lot less than what was on the negotiating table. The Palestinian leadership returned to the country and began to form the Palestinian Authority. People around the world assumed that negotiations would bring a solution. But the occupation was still in effect. By the time the men returned, women had achieved a lot in their position, but the expectation was that men would slot straight back into their position. And women would have to step aside."

Fadwa Allabadi of Al-Quds University has argued that the creation of the Palestinian Authority took place in "an international context where affairs of state are primarily the domain of men; this move necessitated the ‘defeminisation’ of the Palestinian political leadership."

According to Devorah Margolin of the International Institute for Counter-Terrorism, "toward the end of the First Intifada, the Palestinian people, and women especially, became disillusioned with the Palestinian leadership," for reasons including the PLO's decision to support Iraq during the Gulf War, corruption in the newly-formed Palestinian Authority, the failure of Palestinian institutions to provide welfare for all, and failures of peace negotiations to produce a deal. According to Palestinian sociologist Jamil Hilal, grassroots PLO structures, including women's committees, have collapsed following the Oslo Accords, leading to a sentiment among Palestinians since the 1990s "that they had lost their main unified and unifying national institution (the PLO) without gaining an independent state, as Israel continue to colonise their land and ignore their basic rights," while inequality in Palestinian society and Hamas and Palestinian Authority internal policing have increased significantly.

=== Continuing conflict ===
Palestinian women would play a less prominent role in the Second Intifada, which broke out in 2000 and was significantly more violent and militarised than the First. According to Mira Tzoreff of the Institute for National Security Studies, there was a "steady (if slow) decline in the readiness of Palestinian women to bear the full weight of the national goals imposed upon them" during the 1990s, including greater criticism of the role they had in the nationalist movement and the growth of a more individualised and less national conception of motherhood, which contributed to the radicalisation of more marginalised women and the emergence of female suicide bombers during the Second Intifada, while Palestinian suicide attacks by any gender were essentially non-existent during the First.

== See also ==
- Women in Palestine
- Women in Israel
