= The Ridenhour Prizes =

Annual awards

The Ridenhour Prizes are awards in four categories given annually in recognition of those "who persevere in acts of truth-telling that protect the public interest, promote social justice or illuminate a more just vision of society".

== History ==
The awards are presented by The Nation Institute and The Fertel Foundation in recognition of Ron Ridenhour, the Vietnam War veteran who exposed the My Lai Massacre. Each prize carries a $10,000 stipend. The prizes were first awarded in 2004.

== Prize categories ==
- The Ridenhour Courage Prize
- The Ridenhour Book Prize
- The Ridenhour Truth-Telling Prize
- The Ridenhour Documentary Film Prize (since 2011)

== Past winners ==
=== The Ridenhour Courage Prize ===
- 2004: Daniel Ellsberg
- 2005: Seymour Hersh
- 2006: Gloria Steinem
- 2007: Jimmy Carter
- 2008: Bill Moyers
- 2009: Bob Herbert
- 2010: Howard Zinn (posthumous)
- 2011: Russ Feingold
- 2012: John Lewis
- 2013: James Hansen
- 2014: Frederick A.O. Schwarz, Jr.
- 2015: James Risen
- 2016: Jamie Kalven
- 2017: Anna Deavere Smith
- 2018: Tarana Burke
- 2019: George Soros (donated all of prize money to Hungarian Spectrum)
- 2020: Denis Hayes
- 2021: José Andrés
- 2022: Anita Hill
- 2024: Jamie Raskin

=== The Ridenhour Book Prize ===
- 2004: Deborah Scroggins, for Emma's War: An Aid Worker, Radical Islam, and the Politics of Oil – A True Story of Love and Death in the Sudan
- 2005: Adrian Nicole LeBlanc, for Random Family: Love, Drugs, Trouble, and Coming of Age in the Bronx
- 2006: Anthony Shadid, for Night Draws Near: Iraq's People in the Shadow of America's War
- 2007: Rajiv Chandrasekaran, for Imperial Life in the Emerald City: Inside Iraq's Green Zone,
- 2008: James Scurlock, for Maxed Out: Hard Times in the Age of Easy Credit
- 2009: Jane Mayer, for The Dark Side: The Inside Story of How the War on Terror Turned Into A War on American Ideals
- 2010: Joe Sacco, for Footnotes in Gaza
- 2011: Wendell Potter, for Deadly Spin: An Insurance Company Insider Speaks Out on How Corporate PR is Killing Healthcare and Deceiving Americans
- 2012: Ali H. Soufan, for The Black Banners: The Inside Story of 9/11 and the War Against al‐Qaeda
- 2013: Seth Rosenfeld, for Subversives: The FBI's War on Student Radicals, and Reagan's Rise to Power
- 2014: Sheri Fink, for Five Days at Memorial: Life and Death in a Storm-Ravaged Hospital
- 2015: Anand Gopal, for No Good Men Among the Living: America, the Taliban, and the War Through Afghan Eyes
- 2016: Jill Leovy, for Ghettoside: A True Story of Murder in America
- 2017: Heather Ann Thompson, for Blood in the Water: The Attica Prison Uprising of 1971 and Its Legacy
- 2018: Lauren Markham, for The Far Away Brothers: Two Young Migrants and the Making of an American Life
- 2019: Eliza Griswold, for Amity and Prosperity: One Family and the Fracturing of America
- 2020: Chanel Miller for Know My Name: A Memoir
- 2021: Claudio Saunt for Unworthy Republic: The dispossession of Native Americans and the road to Indian Territory
- 2022: Heather McGhee for The Sum of Us: What Racism Costs Everyone and How We Can Prosper Together
- 2024: Lea Ypi for Free: Coming of Age at the End of History

=== The Ridenhour Truth-Telling Prize ===
- 2004: Joseph Wilson
- 2005: Kristen Breitweiser
- 2006: Rick S. Piltz
- 2007: Donald Vance
- 2008: Matthew Diaz
- 2009: Thomas Tamm
- 2010: Matthew Hoh
- 2011: Thomas Andrews Drake
- 2012: Eileen Foster and Daniel L. Davis
- 2013: Jose Antonio Vargas
- 2014: Edward Snowden and Laura Poitras
- 2015: Aicha Elbasri
- 2016: Mona Hanna-Attisha
- 2017: Daniela Vargas
- 2018: Carmen Yulín Cruz Soto
- 2019: Dr. Scott Allen, Dr. Pamela McPherson, and Scott Shuchart
- 2020: Dr. Rick A. Bright
- 2021: Cariol Horne
- 2022: Anika Collier Navaroli
- 2024: Dawn Wooten

=== The Ridenhour Documentary Film Prize ===
- 2011: Julia Bacha, Ronit Avni and Rula Salameh, for Budrus
- 2012: Rachel Libert and Tony Hardmon, for Semper Fi: Always Faithful
- 2013: Kirby Dick and Amy Ziering, for The Invisible War
- 2014: Dawn Porter, for Gideon's Army
- 2015: Laura Poitras, for Citizenfour
- 2016: Joshua Oppenheimer, for The Look of Silence
- 2017: Sonia Kennebeck, for National Bird
- 2018: Joe Piscatella, for Joshua: Teenager vs. Superpower
- 2019: Alexandria Bombach, for On Her Shoulders
- 2020: Nanfu Wang and Jialing Zhang, for One Child Nation
- 2021: Ramona Diaz, for A Thousand Cuts
- 2022: Stanley Nelson Jr. and Traci A. Curry, for Attica
- 2024: Emma Tildes and Tia Lessin for The Janes

=== Special Ridenhour Prize for Reportorial Distinction ===
- 2009: Nick Turse
