= The Skeptic (film) =

- Directed by: Tennyson Bardwell
- Written by: Tennyson Bardwell
- Produced by: Mary-Beth Taylor Tennyson Bardwell; Isen Robbins; Aimee Schoof
- Starring: Tim Daly; Zoe Saldana; Tom Arnold; Andrea Roth
- Cinematography: Claudio Rocha
- Edited by: Ann Marie Lizzi
- Music by: Brett Rosenberg
- Production company: DayDreamer Films
- Distributed by: IFC Films
- Release date: May 1, 2009
- Running time: 89 minutes
- Country: United States
- Language: English
- Box office: $6,671 (domestic)

The Skeptic (also known as: The Haunting of Bryan Becket) is a 2009 American suspense thriller film written and directed by Tennyson Bardwell. Starring Tim Daly, Zoe Saldana, and Tom Arnold, and featuring Robert Prosky (in his final film appearance) and Edward Herrmann, it depicts the story of an attorney who inherits a seemingly haunted house, though he does not believe in the supernatural.

The film was shot in Upstate New York from late 2005 through 2006. Completed in 2008, it was screened at the Cannes Film Festival before being purchased by IFC Films for a limited theatrical release and airing on their video on demand channel as well.

== Plot ==
A police officer responds to a 911 call that came from a large home, upon his investigation he comes across an old woman who had apparently died of fright, holding a set of rosary beads. Bryan Beckett (Tim Daly) is an overly analytical lawyer, whose lack of true emotion has caused a rift in his marriage. When he gets word that his old aunt had died, he assumes he inherits her home as a result of being her remaining kin. He makes it clear he does not believe in life after death, or many other superstitions and treats her death and funeral like everyday events. His friend and partner at the law firm Sully (Tom Arnold) has a seizure when they visit the home and warns Bryan not to enter the closet behind the cross. He recovers having no recollection of saying this. Wanting a separation from his wife to "scare her" into accepting his behavior, Bryan decides to spend a few weeks at his aunt's home. While he is there several strange occurrences are ignored by him that might hint at haunting behavior; a chest in the upstairs bedroom falls unaided, a large shrine is found in the closet behind a crucifix, and the house is filled with strange unexplained noises and glimpses of what appears to be a woman.

Bryan learns that the house was willed to an institute that studies sleep disorders. Upon investigation, the director Koven shows him another department that deals with psychic energy for scientific research. Though he maintains that they do not believe in the paranormal, Bryan decides to contest the will. But the sounds of whispering about an old trunk send him back. After Koven discounts his theories of voices in his house, Bryan goes to his psychiatrist Shepard (Edward Herrmann) who decides that Bryan's stress-induced insomnia is to blame. The visions become more vivid, and Cassie (Zoe Saldana) a psychic specimen of Koven's arrives to scan the house. She comes to several conclusions that Bryan had not disclosed, and the strange sound of someone falling down a flight of stairs that only he can hear clearly disturbs him. While going through an old trunk he found in the basement, Bryan and Cassie come across a doll that absolutely terrifies him into an emotional outrage. The next day, he begins to sense recurring memories of his mother abusing him and locking him in the same closet that seems to be the source of the hauntings. Shepard confirms this, and allows Bryan to remember that as a five-year-old, due to the harsh treatment by his mother, he consciously placed toys on the stairs, causing her to fall down them to her death. Shepard and Bryan's father used Bryan's repressed memories to make him forget about the event entirely. This makes Bryan realize that it is the ghost of his mother haunting the house.

He returns to his aunt's home, but decides against going in. He sees Cassie's car parked in the driveway and calls her from outside the house but he is unable to reach her, so he enters the home searching for her. He calls her cell phone again and she answers. He asks why she left her car in the driveway and she says she didn't. He looks out the window and finds that her car is not there. Bryan realizes that his mother tricked him to get him in the house. A now angry Bryan, storms from the room and finds his mother's body lying on the floor at the foot of the stairs. The shock causes him to faint and he falls down the stairs, landing where his mother had died. As his mother touches his face, he receives a vision of the picnic he had missed on the day before her death, when she had locked him in the closet for leaving a sock on the floor when he cleaned his room. It is implied in this vision, that she is apologizing to him for her deeds; then all goes dark and Bryan finds himself at the foot of the stairs as the screen goes dark.

== Cast ==
- Tim Daly as Bryan Beckett
- Tom Arnold as Sully
- Zoe Saldana as Cassie
- Andrea Roth as Robin Beckett
- Edward Herrmann as Shepard
- Robert Prosky as Father Wymond
- Bruce Altman as Koven
- Lea Coco as Deputy
- Sara Weaver as Helena Beckett
- L.J. Foley as Young Beckett
- Paul Tietjen as Michael
- Julia Ricciardi as Lizzie Borden

== Production ==
Writer and director Tennyson Bardwell . Mary-Beth Taylor, was one of the film producers, along with Bardwell himself, Isen Robbins, and Aimee Schoof.

Shooting began in 2005, with eight weeks spent filming in various locations around the Saratoga Springs, New York area – including the city Court House, the Olde Bryan Inn, the Union Gables Bed and Breakfast as well as Union College in nearby Schenectady, The Batcheller Mansion Inn was used for the three-story Victorian mansion where much of the film takes place. The production paid for exclusive use of the mansion for five weeks during its off-season. Filming was completed in 2006, and post-production finished in 2008.

In creating the film, in a markedly different genre from his first work, the 2004 comedy Dorian Blues, Bardwell aimed to create a film that would be "a Rorschach test for people's beliefs", in which viewers would have different ideas of what happened. Intended to concentrate on the psychological rather than gore, the film has no "blood and guts" and instead requires viewers to be skeptical and open to the different possible interpretations of the ending.

== Release ==
The Skeptic was presented at the 2008 Cannes Film Festival, after which the Independent Film Channel purchased it for distribution. IFC first released it to their video on demand channel on April 29, 2009. The film premiered theatrically in Saratoga Springs and at the IFC Center in New York City on May 1, 2009, in Albany, New York on May 8, 2009, and in Beverly Hills on May 15, 2009.

== Reception ==
On the review aggregator website Rotten Tomatoes, 8% of 12 critics' reviews are positive.
