= Eileen Foster =

Bank of America executive and whistleblower

Eileen foster was the executive vice president of Fraud Risk Management at Countrywide, and later senior vice president of the Mortgage Fraud Investigations Division at Bank of America (when the two merged), until she blew the whistle on massive and widespread systemic home loan fraud in 2008. She has received significant media coverage (including a series by iWatch News and 60 Minutes) as a key whistleblower of the financial crisis.

Foster won her wrongful termination whistleblower complaint against the Bank of America in September 2011, however the company appealed and another hearing was to happen in October 2012. Foster was represented by the Government Accountability Project.

For her actions as a whistleblower, she was awarded the 2012 Ridenhour Prize for Truth-Telling.

== Background at Countrywide ==
Foster joined Countrywide Home Loans in 2005 as First Vice President overseeing borrower complaint risk in the Corporate Office of the President. Nine months later she was promoted to Senior Vice President, and in March 2007 to Executive Vice President of Fraud Risk Management. In that role, she supervised 30-40 staff responsible for investigating mortgage origination fraud. Foster was also responsible for reporting fraud and suspicious activity to regulators and the company's board of directors.

== Blowing the Whistle on Home Loan Fraud ==
Foster oversaw an investigation in the summer of 2007 of multiple branches in the Boston area of the subprime division. Investigators found evidence that employees had forged borrower signatures, altered and fabricated income and asset documentation, and manipulated the company's automated underwriting and property valuation systems. The investigation was opened after receiving a tip from a former branch employee who had been fired after objecting to the fraudulent practices.

After her investigation, a number of employees were let go and Countrywide shut down six branch offices in Boston.

By February 2008, Foster had found similar activities in investigations in Miami, Chicago, Cincinnati, San Diego, Las Vegas and Los Angeles. Foster believed that Countrywide Employee Relations and Lending Managers were colluding to circumvent fraud reporting channels in order to conceal the fraud perpetrated by high-producing loan officers and managers.

According to a 60 Minutes interview, whistleblowing employees were told to circumvent Foster's office and were instead directed to report fraud and wrongdoing to the company's Employee Relations department. Those employees were allegedly being transferred, demoted, harassed or terminated. Foster asked Countrywide's Internal Audit to investigate Employee Relations. The company chose to conceal Foster's allegations from Bank of America (with whom they were merging) and instead directed Employee Relations to investigate Foster.

Foster's allegations of retaliation were ignored and Countrywide's Employee Relations convinced Bank of America managers to terminate Foster on September 8, 2008.

Foster was offered $228,000 for her silence. She instead filed a Sarbanes-Oxley Act whistleblower complaint with the Occupational Safety & Health Administration (OSHA), challenging the legality of her firing. In September 2011, OSHA ruled that Foster had been retaliated against in violation of the employee protection provision of the Sarbanes Oxley Corporate and Criminal Fraud Accountability Act of 2002. The Department of Labor ordered her reinstatement and $930,000 in damages.

Bank of America has challenged OSHA's ruling. Another hearing has been set for October 2012.

== Ridenhour Prize for Truth-Telling ==
In April 2012, Foster was named one of the recipients of the Ridenhour Prizes. She and Afghan War whistleblower Lt. Col. Daniel Davis were co-winners of the Ridenhour Prize for Truth-Telling, widely considered the highest American honor for whistleblowers. In her speech, Foster called on the US Department of Justice to prosecute financial executives who perpetrated and were complicit in the widespread financial fraud.
