= The Signals Network =

Whistleblower protection and support organization

- Type: Non-profit organization
- Headquarters: San Francisco, California
- Key people: Delphine Halgand-Mishra (Executive director)
- Website: thesignalsnetwork.org

The Signals Network (TSN) is a 501(c)(3) non-profit organization founded in 2017 by a coalition of journalists, lawyers, whistleblowers, technology entrepreneurs, and transparency activists. The organization supports whistleblowers who have shared public interest information and has helped coordinate international media investigations addressing corporate misconduct and human rights abuses.

TSN describes its approach to whistleblower support as independent and global. The organization provides services, including legal assistance, psychological support, physical security measures, temporary safe housing, online safety protection, career guidance and communication support. TSN's Whistleblower Protection Program aims to help whistleblowers navigate the legal, physical, psychological and economic consequences of speaking out. Through its Whistleblower Protection Fund, TSN also offers direct financial aid to those in need.

TSN was founded by Gilles Raymond, a French entrepreneur who serves as the organization's founding chairman. TSN's executive director is Delphine Halgand-Mishra, who previously worked at Reporters Without Borders.

The Signals Network is an associate partner of Whistleblowing International Network and a member of the Institute for Nonprofit News. It is among the whistleblower organizations recommended by the Office of the Whistleblower Ombuds in the United States Congress.

== Activities (cases) ==
TSN supported Eyes of Iran, an investigative project coordinated by Forbidden Stories revealing the Iranian government's use of Russian facial recognition technology to monitor its citizens. Leaked documents from Russian and Iranian companies, along with source code, showed how Iran acquired the software, known as Findface.. Media partners on the project included Le Monde, Paper Trail Media, Der Spiegel, Der Standard, Tamedia, and ZDF.

TSN is collaborating with The Guardian and the University of Cambridge on a project aimed at gathering feedback from people who have previously blown the whistle. TSN offers anonymity protections for participants who require it.

The Signals Network represents whistleblower Joshua Farinella, a former general manager at Choice Canning Company’s shrimp processing factory in India, who disclosed evidence of food safety, labor and human rights abuses. Following Farinella’s revelations, the U.S. Food and Drug Administration (FDA) began refusing shrimp imports from the company after tests detected veterinary drugs in recent shipments. The Signals Network assisted Farinella in filing whistleblower reports with the FDA, Customs and Border Protection and U.S. lawmakers. The case drew significant attention, with the House Committee on Natural Resources requesting access to Farinella’s evidence and two congressmembers urging President Joe Biden to halt shrimp imports from India. This case highlights broader concerns, as reports reveal widespread human rights and environmental abuses in India’s shrimp industry, alongside minimal FDA testing of imports.

The Signals Network represented Twitter whistleblower Anika Collier Navaroli, who provided testimony to the House Select Committee to Investigate the January 6th Attack on the United States Capitol, and provides her with support through its Whistleblower Protection Program. Government Accountability Project joined The Signals Network as co-counsel for Anika Navaroli for testifying on February 8, 2023, to the U.S. House Committee on Oversight and Accountability during a hearing titled "Protecting Speech from Government Interference and Social Media Bias, Part 1: Twitter’s Role in Suppressing the Biden Laptop Story."

In July 2022, The Signals Network represented Mark MacGann, the whistleblower behind the Uber files case. In October 2022, MacGann testified before the European Parliament’s Employment Committee about the Uber Files and the impact of the gig economy on worker’s rights. Prior to the hearing, the Signals Network sent a letter to the Chair of the committee, objecting to the proposed setup for the hearing, which would have seen MacGann and a representative of Uber representatives sharing the same panel. The letter set out The Signals Network’s concerns about the failure of the Committee to follow the recently passed European Directive on Whistleblowing and to take into account the impact of the proposed format on MacGann. In response to the letter, the European Commission altered the format for MacGann’s testimony.

The Signals Network has provided whistleblower protection including legal and psychological services to Daniel Motaung, a former Facebook content moderator who came forward to TIME sharing his story of trauma, poverty wages and alleged union busting inside a Facebook content moderation center in Kenya. Time magazine reporter Billy Perrigo wrote the February 2022 front-cover story based on Motaung’s testimony titled “Inside Facebook’s African Sweatshop.”

The Signals Network coordinated the international media consortium that reported EdTech Exposed, an independent collaborative investigation that had early access to Human Rights Watch’s report, data, and technical evidence on alleged violations of children’s rights by governments that endorsed education technologies during the Covid-19 pandemic. The consortium provided weeks of independent reporting by more than 25 investigative journalists on six continents and seven languages. The potential reach for the EdTech Exposed story is more than 185 million readers in seven languages.

The Signals Network coordinated the logistics of the media partners’ collaboration on publishing an investigation into the working conditions at the Chinese technology company Huawei. The controversial telecoms giant, which has been classed as a national security threat by the US government, stated in its HR handbook that Chinese employees who have married Europeans or applied for citizenship must leave Europe “as soon as possible”, or be sacked from the company altogether.
