= Hungarian Spectrum =

Hungarian daily blog

Hungarian Spectrum was a daily blog from 2007 to 2021, covering current political and social developments in Hungary. Created in 2007 by historian Eva S. Balogh, it came to an end with her death, on November 30, 2021.

== History ==
Hungarian Spectrum was published daily, seven days a week, starting June 27, 2007. It has been permanently archived in the Library of Congress as of 2013 where it remains available online, as well as in the Blinken Open Society Archives. Balogh, who specialized in interwar Hungarian history, researched and wrote most of the articles. Based on primary sources in Hungarian, German and English, the articles analyzed current developments in Hungary for the nonspecialist reader from a historian's perspective.

The blog also occasionally included articles written by guest scholars such as Kim Lane Scheppele, Johanna Laakso, Charles Gati and Randolph L. Braham.

Hungarian Spectrum was supported by voluntary donations from its readers. Businessman George Soros, winner of the Ridenhour Prize for Courage in April 2019, donated his prize money to Hungarian Spectrum, describing it as a site that "renders an important service by exposing to the world what Prime Minister Orban is telling his own people."

Following the death of Balogh, Hungarian Spectrum ceased publications.

== Political orientation ==
Eva S. Balogh often wrote entries highly critical of the current government in power in Hungary, led by Viktor Orbán. She was described by Ference Kumin as having had close ties with the opposition to the government. Balogh was a regular guest on ATV television programmes and published opinion pieces in Népszava, a social-democratic newspaper. In November 2009, she gave a lecture for CIA officials at Langley, Virginia, where she characterized the imminent right-wing Fidesz victory in the 2010 Hungarian parliamentary election as a possible fascist breakthrough.

== See also ==
- Politics of Hungary
