= Rebekah Wingert-Jabi =

American documentary film director

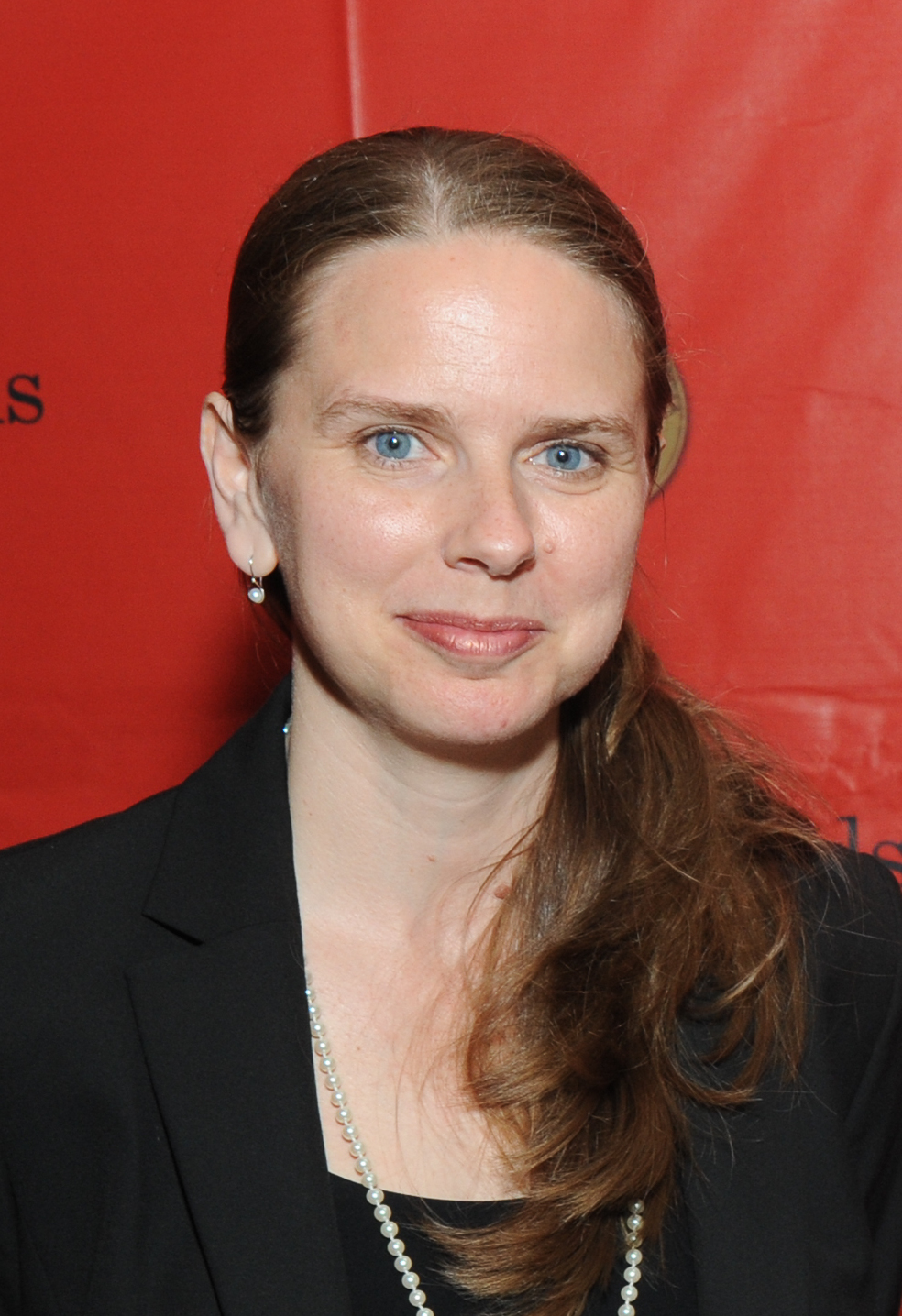
- Rebekah Wingert-Jabi at the 72nd Annual Peabody Awards
- Born: Rebekah Lee Wingert
- Occupation: documentary film director
- Years active: 2000-present
- Known for: My Neighbourhood
- Website: therestonfilm.com/filmmakers

Rebekah Wingert-Jabi is an American documentary film director best known for the documentary My Neighbourhood.

== Background ==
Wingert-Jabi is the child of Vernon Wingert and Victoria Wingert. Her father worked for the Federal Emergency Management Agency (FEMA). Her mother served on the board of directors for the Reston Association and was later president of the Reston Historic Trust. She grew up in Reston and nearby Oakton, Virginia.

She received a MFA in film and television production from the University of Southern California's School of Cinematic Arts.

== Career ==
Wingert-Jabi began her film career in 2000. She has produced, directed, and edited film and television. Films on which she has worked have appeared on the Discovery Channel, Public Broadcasting Service (PBS), Al Arabiya, and Al Jazeera English networks.

She lived in the West Bank for eight years and worked with Palestinian and Israeli filmmakers to produce films including Swish, Swish and documentaries including A Good Samaritan. She taught at Al Quds University and Dar Al Kalima College. She managed youth media projects including Palestinian-Israeli video exchange.

With Julia Bacha, she co-directed, co-produced, and edited the film My Neighbourhood, produced by Just Vision. The film premiered at the Tribeca Film Festival in 2012 and debuted on US television on Al Jazeera English. It also showed at the Washington West Film Festival, Warsaw Jewish Film Festival (2012), Al Jazeera International Documentary Film Festival (2012), Sheffield Doc/Fest (2012), DokuFest (2012), Movies That Matter (2013), San Francisco Jewish Film Festival (2012), Chicago Palestine Film Festival (2013), and Camden International Film Festival (2012), Tiburon Film Festival, and Documenta Madrid (2012).

In 2014, she held a sneak peek private screening of Another Way of Living, a documentary on Reston, Virginia, one of America's foremost New Towns for the 50th anniversary of the founding of Reston.

Her film company is Storycatcher Productions, based in Reston.

== Awards ==
- 2012 Peabody Award for My Neighbourhood
- 2005 Thomas Bush Cinematography scholarship

== Work ==
Director:

- 2015 A Bird in the Hand (in production)
- 2014 Another Way of Living (in post-production)
- 2012 My Neighbourhood (co-director)

Producer:

- 2015 A Bird in the Hand (in production)
- 2014 Another Way of Living (in post-production) (co-producer)
- 2012 My Neighbourhood (co-producer)
- 2012 Besa: The Promise (associate)
- 2009 Budrus (associate)

Writer:

- 2012 My Neighbourhood

Editor:

- 2015 A Bird in the Hand (in production)
- 2014 Another Way of Living (in post-production)
- 2012 My Neighbourhood
- 2005 In the Shadows
- 2003 Unsyncables at Any Age

Cinematographer:

- 2015 A Bird in the Hand (in production)
- 2014 Another Way of Living (in post-production)
- 2012 My Neighbourhood

Set decorator

- 2004 Playing

== Personal ==
Wingert-Jabi is married, has a daughter, and lives in Reston.

== External sources ==
- Rebekah Wingert-Jabi at IMDb
- "Rebekah Wingert-Jabi". Just Vision.
- "Filmmakers". The Reston Film. 12 April 2013.
- "My Neighbourhood". Tribeca Film Festival. 2012.
