= Boycott (2021 film) =

2021 documentary film

- Directed by: Julia Bacha
- Produced by: Just Vision; Suhad Babaa; Daniel J. Chalfen
- Cinematography: Amber Fares; Kelly West
- Edited by: Flavia de Souza; Eric Metzgar
- Music by: Nainita Desai
- Release date: November 14, 2021 (DOC NYC)
- Running time: 70 minutes
- Country: United States

Boycott is a documentary film about three Americans' lawsuits against their state governments in response to anti-BDS laws which caused said governments to cancel their business contracts after they refused to pledge that they would not engage in a boycott of Israel. The film is directed by Julia Bacha; it premiered in 2021.

== Synopsis ==
Boycott explores anti-BDS laws and related freedom of speech issues through the stories of a publisher, an attorney, and a pediatric speech pathologist. The three Americans filed lawsuits against their state governments in response to the laws' effects on their respective livelihoods when said governments canceled their business contracts after they refused to pledge that they would not engage in a boycott of Israel.

=== Alan Leveritt ===
Alan Leveritt is the publisher of the Arkansas Times, a liberal publication. Leveritt is not specifically interested in boycotts of Israel but objects to the anti-boycott law in Arkansas because of its implications for free speech. As a result, the Times can no longer receive advertising payments from a local state university. In response, Leveritt and the American Civil Liberties Union sue the state of Arkansas. As of December 1, 2021, the suit was still active in the court system and the Arkansas law was still in effect.

=== Bahia Amawi ===
Bahia Amawi is a pediatric speech pathologist in Texas. As a Palestinian American, Amawi boycotts Israel in solidarity with her family who lives under the Israeli occupation of the Palestinian Territories. Despite the need for her services in her school district near Austin as a speech pathologist who can speak Arabic, she is fired after refusing to pledge not to engage in boycotts. Amawi's challenge to the law in Texas is successful, and she regains her contract and forces legislators to narrow the scope of the legislation.

=== Mik Jordahl ===
Mik Jordahl is a lawyer in Arizona who has pledged to boycott companies involved in the Israeli occupation after taking a trip to the West Bank with his son, who is Jewish. As a result of anti-boycott laws, he is forced to give up a contract to provide legal assistance to incarcerated people; he experiences financial difficulty after continuing to provide the legal services pro bono. Jordahl's challenge to the law in Arizona is successful, and he regains his contract and forces legislators to narrow the scope of the legislation.

=== Additional content ===
The documentary juxtaposes Amawi and Jordahl's legal victories with information about the successful lobbying effort that led to the implementation of anti-boycott laws in 34 states. It links these laws to the American Legislative Exchange Council, describing the Council as the origin of the efforts to pass them at the state level; it additionally states that the Israeli government created a firm called Kella Shlomo to bypass United States laws against foreign interference, and that the firm provided millions of dollars in funding to groups that went on to support the anti-BDS legislation, including Christians United for Israel.

== Production ==
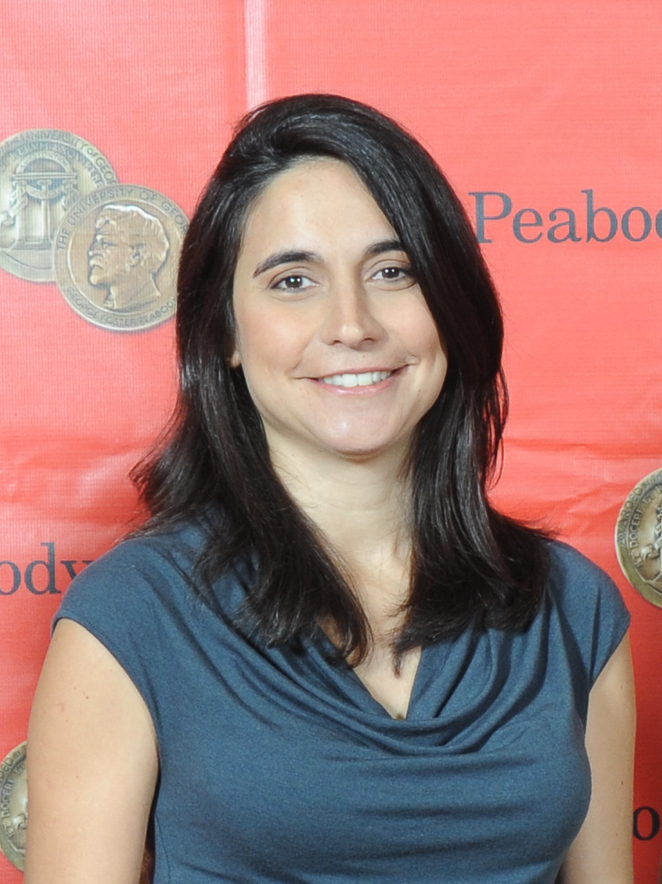
Julia Bacha, director of Boycott

Boycott is directed by Julia Bacha, who had previously created other films that were critical of the Israeli occupation; these films, produced in partnership with Just Vision, focused on relations between Palestinians and Israelis. In contrast, Boycott focuses on anti-BDS laws and anti-boycott laws in America specifically. The film was produced by Just Vision and by the company's leader Suhad Babaa, as well as by Daniel J. Chalfen. Cinematographers were Amber Fares and Kelly West, while editors were Flavia de Souza and Eric Metzgar. Music was composed by Nainita Desai.

According to Bacha, production of Boycott was funded primarily by grants from groups including Doc Society, International Documentary Association, Fork Films, Sundance Institute, CrossCurrents Foundation, and Threshold Foundation.

Produced in the United States, the documentary has a runtime of 70 minutes.

== Release ==
Boycott premiered on November 14, 2021 at Doc NYC. The film was shown at the 2022 South by Southwest Film Festival, and in March 2022 at the Human Rights Watch Film Festival in London.

== Reception ==
Boycott was reviewed in The Austin Chronicle after its appearance at South by Southwest 2022. The review praised the film's for avoiding false balance by focusing on "the pain of the Palestinian people", but stated that "for all its focus on Palestine and Israel [...] Boycott is a film about American politics and the forces that would choose to influence it". It concluded that "while Boycott presents us with positive outcomes – legal restrictions overcome or suspended – it’s hard not to feel unfinished [...] with so much power and money being unleashed on our legal system, it’s hard to feel like any political documentary offers true closure". A review in Mondoweiss found that "the triumph of Boycott is that it puts human faces to the struggle", characterizing the core message of the film as "people can have impact on the world around them".
