= Tennyson Bardwell =

American film director

Tennyson Bardwell is an American film and TV commercial director and screenwriter.

== Biography ==
Tennyson Bardwell received a Bachelor of Fine Arts degree in acting and writing from Carnegie-Mellon University in Pittsburgh, Pennsylvania. During his time there, won the Pittsburgh Playhouse Award and the Henry Boetchner Award.

His first feature film, Dorian Blues, made in 2004 and released theatrically in Manhattan on September 23, 2005, won 14 film festival awards, including general and first-feature Audience Awards at the Lake Placid Film Festival, Outfest, the Long Island International Film Forum and the Philadelphia Gay & Lesbian Film Festival. His second film, The Skeptic, was completed in 2007, released to pay-per-view television on April 29, 2009, and released in New York City on May 1, 2009. It was filmed in and around Saratoga Springs, New York. Bardwell is preparing his third feature, "Bully Pulpit", a thriller-drama, to be followed by "Dancehall". His TV-commercial works includes spots for Heinz Tomato Ketchup.

As of April 2009, Bardwell lives in New York City with his film producer and manager wife, Mary-Beth Taylor, and their three sons.
