= Anika Collier Navaroli =

American researcher and whistleblower

- Education: University of Florida (BS); University of North Carolina (JD); Columbia University (MS)
- Occupations: Researcher, writer, and lawyer
- Known for: Whistleblowing about platform moderation at Twitter during the presidency of Donald Trump

Anika Collier Navaroli is an American researcher, writer, and lawyer who is director of the Craig Newmark Center for Journalism Ethics and Security and an assistant professor at the Columbia Journalism School. Previously she was on the safety policy team at Twitter and came forward as a whistleblower to the United States House Select Committee on the January 6 Attack about platform moderation at Twitter during the presidency of Donald Trump.

== Early life and education ==
Navaroli grew up in Florida. She earned a Bachelor of Science in journalism from the University of Florida, then earned a Juris Doctor from the University of North Carolina School of Law in 2012. She earned a Master of Science in journalism from Columbia University Graduate School of Journalism, where she wrote a thesis on constitutional law and social media titled "The Revolution Will Be Tweeted".

== Career ==
After earning her master's degree, Navaroli worked in communications and marketing at law firms. Later, she joined the civil rights non-profit Color of Change.

In 2019, Navaroli joined Twitter's safety policy team to help work on content moderation and conduct policies. In 2020, she began to grow concerned about rhetoric by Donald Trump against Joe Biden, at the time his opponent in the presidential election, which she believed was contributing to a broader increase in hate speech and incitement to violence on the platform. She began to push internally for stronger policies after Trump directed the far-right Proud Boys during a September 2020 presidential debate to "stand back and stand by". She said that she and her team advocated for stricter and more precise policies around dog whistles, but that they were rebuffed by executives who were pleased that Trump favored Twitter over other social media networks. She also said that Twitter had broken its own rules in declining to label or remove Trump's tweets. On the night of January 5, 2021, the eve of the January 6 United States Capitol attack, Navaroli participated in a team meeting where they discussed their concerns over what might happen the following day, after seeing calls to violence. After the meeting, Navaroli wrote to a colleague: "When people are shooting each other in the streets tomorrow, I'm going to try and rest in the knowledge that we tried." Navaroli left Twitter in March 2021 and began working for Twitch.

In July 2022, after receiving a subpoena, Navaroli testified before the United States House Select Committee on the January 6 Attack about Twitter's tolerance for Donald Trump's behavior on the platform. At first, she testified anonymously under the pseudonym "J. Smith", and the Committee protected her identity by using a voice changer on portions of her audio testimony that were made public. In September 2022 she revealed her identity and testified again. Afterwards, she began to receive racist and sexist messages, as well as rape and death threats. In February 2023, she testified again about Twitter's internal policies in a hearing by the United States House Committee on Oversight and Accountability on the Hunter Biden laptop controversy.

Navaroli later said she believed the hearings were a "real missed opportunity", and that the committee had not taken sufficient action with respect to social media companies' role in the January 6 attack. "[Social media companies'] role or their responsibility within that day and the events of that day, and the violence that occurred, has not been fully laid out" in the committee's report, she said.

Navaroli later became a fellow at Stanford University, where she studied online moderation of hate speech and the impact on employees tasked with performing such moderation. In August 2023, she joined the Columbia University Graduate School of Journalism as a senior fellow.

In January 2026, she was named the Craig Newmark Assistant Professor of Professional Practice and Director of the Craig Newmark Center for Journalism Ethics and Security.

== Recognition ==
Navaroli was awarded the Ridenhour Truth-Telling Prize and the Columbia Journalism School's Alumni Courage Award for her Congressional testimony. Whistleblower protection group The Signals Network awarded her the Unicorn Fund.

== Personal life ==
As of September 2022, Navaroli was living in California. She is queer.

== See also ==
- Peiter "Mudge" Zatko – Twitter whistleblower
