= Just Vision =

Just Vision is a non religiously unaffiliated nonprofit organization that utilizes storytelling, media and public engagement campaigns to highlight Palestinian and Israeli grassroots leaders working to end the occupation and conflict through unarmed means. It is based in Washington, New York and Jerusalem.

== Background ==
Just Vision was formed in 2003 by Ronit Avni as a result of two years of research and over 475 interviews on the Israeli–Palestinian conflict. The goal of the interviews was "to find out what kind of support they needed to advance peace. The overwhelming answer was to become more visible. The pockets of nonviolent activists throughout the region need a space to link and promote their messages." The interviews eventually became the basis for Just Vision's films and Visionaries interview series.

== Filmography ==
- Encounter Point (2006)
- Budrus (2009)
- Home Front: Portraits From Sheikh Jarrah (2011)
- My Neighbourhood (2012)
- Naila and the Uprising (2017)
- Boycott (2021)

The first film to be released by Just Vision was Encounter Point in 2006. According to Anita Gates of The New York Times, "This film may prompt others to take up the cause."

Just Vision's second film, Budrus, is the best known, and has reached diverse audiences worldwide. The film is about nonviolent demonstrations conducted by the residents of Budrus (a Palestinian town in the Ramallah and al-Bireh Governorate) during the early 2000s to protest against the building of the Israeli West Bank barrier inside of the village. Budrus initially debuted on the festival circuit in 2009 at the Dubai International Film Festival. It also played at the Tribeca Film Festival.

Since the release of Budrus, Just Vision has released two new film projects on the growing trend of home evictions in East Jerusalem. The first is a series of shorts called Home Front: Portraits From Sheikh Jarrah, followed by a 25-minute documentary, My Neighbourhood, co-directed and co-produced by Rebekah Wingert-Jabi and Julia Bacha. Both projects follow the individual stories of Palestinian and Israeli nonviolent resistance to the eviction of Palestinian families. My Neighbourhood premiered in 2012 at the Tribeca Film Festival, and has been screened across the United States, as well as at the European Parliament.

In 2017, Just Vision produced Naila and the Uprising, directed by Julia Bacha. It was a documentary that highlighted the hardships Palestinians faced against Israel. In 2018, Facebook blocked the trailer for Naila and the Uprising for all Facebook users in Israel. In a message to the operators of the Local Call Facebook page that attempted to post the trailer, which Just Vision helps fund, Facebook said, “Your ad was not approved because it doesn’t conform to our advertising policy. We don’t allow advertising that includes shocking, derogatory or sensational content, including ads that depict violence or threats of violence.” Yet hours before the film's screening in Jaffa, Israel, the ad received approval to run on the site.

In 2021, Just Vision produced the documentary film Boycott.

== Awards ==
Just Vision is the recipient of numerous film awards:

2006

Encounter Point

- Winner: Audience Award Best Documentary at San Francisco International Film Festival
- Winner: Audience Award Best Documentary at Rencontres International Film Festival
- Winner: Spirit of Freedom Award, Bahamas International Film Festival
- Winner: Best Musical Score at Bend Film Festival

2007

- Winner: Grand Jury Prize, Best Documentary at São Paulo Jewish Film Festivals
- Winner: Best First Documentary, Docupólis Film Festival (Barcelona)

2009

Budrus

- King Hussein Leadership Prize

2010

- Winner, Panorama Audience Award Second Prize, Berlin International Film Festival
- Winner, Special Jury Mention, Tribeca Film Festival
- Winner, Audience Award, San Francisco International Film Festival
- Winner, Honorable Mention for Best Documentary in the Spirit of Freedom Award, Jerusalem International Film Festival
- Winner, Witness Award at Silverdocs Film Festival
- Winner, Honorable Mention of the Jury, Documenta Madrid
- Winner, Amnesty Italia Award, Pesaro Film Festival
- Winner, Founders Prize, Best of Fest, Nonfiction, Traverse City Film Festival
- Winner, Checkpoints Award, Bergen International Film Festival
- Winner, Festival des Libertés Prize, Festival des Libertés
- Winner, Spirit of Freedom Documentary Award, Bahamas International Film Festival
- Circles of Change Award
- The Common Ground Award

2011

- Winner, Amnesty's Matter of Act Human Rights Award, Movies That Matter Film Festival
- Winner, Jury Award for Excellence in Documenting a Human Rights Issue, Bellingham Human Rights Film Festival
- The Henry Hampton Award for Excellence in Film and Digital Media
- The Ridenhour Documentary Film Prize
