= Dorian Blues =

- Poster
- Directed by: Tennyson Bardwell
- Written by: Tennyson Bardwell
- Produced by: Tennyson Bardwell; Mary-Beth Taylor; Portia Kamons; Frank D'Andrea
- Starring: Michael McMillian; Lea Coco; Steven Charles Fletcher; Mo Quigley
- Cinematography: Taylor Morrison
- Edited by: Ann Marie Lizzi
- Music by: Will Severin
- Production company: DayDreamer Films
- Distributed by: TLA Releasing
- Release dates: March 12, 2004 (San Jose); September 23, 2005
- Running time: 88 minutes
- Country: United States
- Language: English
- Budget: $185,000
- Box office: $72,234

Dorian Blues is a 2004 comedy-drama film about a gay teenager coming to terms with his identity in upstate New York. The film was written and directed by Tennyson Bardwell and is loosely based on Bardwell's college roommate.

== Plot synopsis ==
High school senior Dorian Lagatos realizes he is gay and meets another gay youth locally, but remains confused, and finally comes out to his brother, Nicky. Nicky is a scholarship-winning quarterback and favorite son to their hetero-normative and argumentative father. Dorian starts therapy, then resorts to confession in the Church. When his therapist and the church politely avoid offering any real help, Dorian has his first intimate encounter with a local gay youth. Dorian goes back to Nick, who was at first reluctant to accept his brother's sexuality. Nick attempts to teach Dorian how to fight and arranges to have him spend a night with a prostitute in order to make him become straight; from these efforts Dorian gains only a concussion and lesson in dancing, respectively.

After much soul-searching, Dorian comes out to his father (while wearing a fuchsia shirt) for which he is kicked out of the house after a very surreal argument over whether or not Dorian is gay. His father is very preoccupied with who else may know of Dorian's defective nature although Nick confesses that he knows and an anticlimactic scene resolves with Dorian packing his bags. Dorian moves to New York City, a city he adores. Dorian expresses all kinds of angst over his life style, defending his true nature to his father over the Christmas holidays. Returning to New York, Dorian experiences a series of encounters with the darker side of life. Dorian finds a boyfriend, but he gets dumped after two months with no given reason. Dorian develops a deep depression and finally, in despair gives in to it, coincidental to Nicky visiting Dorian in the city.

Nicky reluctantly joins Dorian with friends at Dorian's favorite local gay bar. Just as Dorian pleads with a friend to flaunt his newly found popularity, Nicky reunites with obsequious football friends—stealing Dorian's thunder. Dorian then learns his ex-boyfriend dumped him for another. The after-discussion of the evening revolves around Nick defending his sexuality to Dorian in the face of Nick's football friends being gay and Dorian defending his own sexuality to his brother. Later that night, Dorian awakes to Nicky crying and learn that Nick was cut from the football team and was stripped of his scholarship. In the middle of the discussion, they both learn their father has died of a heart attack. At the funeral, Dorian's mother, finally freed of the overbearing influence of Dorian's father, tells Dorian she regrets not stopping his father from being angry with him.

== Cast ==
- Michael McMillian as Dorian Lagatos
- Lea Coco as Nick "Nicky" Lagatos
- Steven Charles Fletcher as Tom Lagatos
- Mo Quigley as Maria Lagatos
- Austin Basis as Spooky
- Ryan Kelly Berkowitz as Tiffany
- Chris Dallman as Andrew
- Carl Danna as Priest
- Leslie Elliard as Therapist
- Sian Heder as Ellie
- Cody Nickell as Ben
- Jeff Paul as Social worker
- Jack Abele as Ben's father

== Filming locations ==
Some of the film took place in Delmar, New York and Glenmont, New York. Including scenes of Empire State Building, New York Public Library, Metropolitan Museum of Art and Central Park.

== Reception ==
=== Critical response ===
The New York Times said that "Bardwell’s writing remains acridly clever".

Richard Mellor of eyeforfilm.co.uk stated it is "an indie slow-burn" and "understated coming-out drama". Dennis Harvey of Variety said "nothing special in outline, but sharp performances and writing lend it a fresh appeal" and "assured debut for writer-director".

On Rotten Tomatoes the film has an approval rating of 65% based on reviews from 23 critics. On metacritic it has a score of 52% based on reviews from 16 critics.

=== Accolades ===
Dorian Blues won eight awards at the first nine film festivals it screened at and has won its fourteenth award, including the Best First Feature Award at Outfest in Los Angeles.

Dorian Blues won the audience award and the Emerging Maverick Director's Award at the Cinequest Film Festival in San Jose where it had its world premiere. The film won a special jury award at the Fort Lauderdale Film Festival, the audience award at the Lake Placid Film Festival and best screenplay award at the New York Lesbian, Gay, Bisexual, & Transgender Film Festival, which was sponsored by the Writers Guild East. The film won the audience award for best first feature at Outfest, which included a $5,000 cash award sponsored by HBO. The film also won the audience award for best feature film at the Long Island International Film Forum and the audience award at the Philadelphia International Gay & Lesbian Film Festival. At the Bahamas International Film Festival, The film won the Torchlight Best Feature award sponsored by New York University. Dorian Blues won the audience award the 2005 Out Far! Lesbian & Gay Film Festival in Phoenix, Arizona. In Torino, Italy, it got the audience and best film awards. It also received the audience award at film festival in Copenhagen.

=== Home video ===
Dorian Blues was released on Region 1 DVD (US and Canada), and on Region 2 DVD on 26 January 2009 (Europe).
