= Budrus =

Palestinian village in Ramallah and al-Bireh, State of Palestine

- Municipality type C

Arabic transcription(s)
  - Arabic: بُدرُس
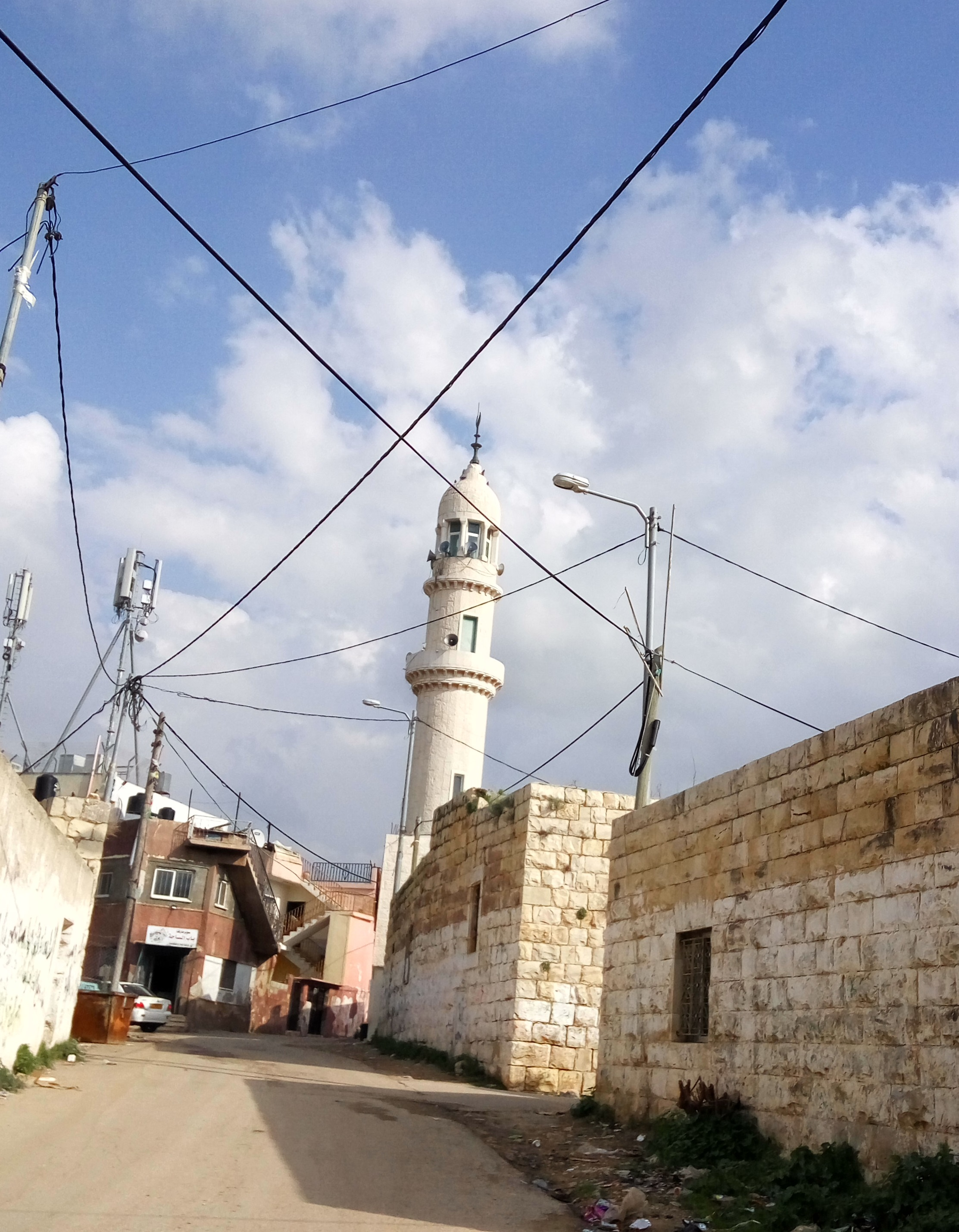

- Location of Budrus within Palestine
- Coordinates: 31°58′00″N 34°59′37″E
- Palestine grid: 149/152
- State: State of Palestine
- Governorate: Ramallah and al-Bireh

Government
  - Type: Municipality

Population (2017)
  - Total: 1,596
- Name meaning: from Budrus, personal name

Budrus (Arabic: بُدرُس) is a Palestinian village in the Ramallah and al-Bireh Governorate, located 31 kilometers northwest of Ramallah in the northern West Bank. According to the Palestinian Central Bureau of Statistics (PCBS), the village had a population of 1,596 inhabitants in 2017.

== Location ==
Budrus is located 21 kilometers (13 mi) north-west of Ramallah. It is bordered by Qibya and Ni'lin to the east, Qibya to the north, the Green line to the west, and Ni'lin to the south.

== History ==
"Budrus" is Arabic for "Peter" and in ancient times the village was known as Patris. The site of the modern village is just east of the 1949 armistice line, while the ancient village was probably 2 km away at Khirbet Budrus, on the west side of the line.

Under the name of Patris (or Patros), Budrus was mentioned in the Jewish Tosefta (Demai 1) as being included in the boundary of the southern mountains of Judea, at the entrance of the King's Mountains. The same passage mentions a local fair held at the village in Talmudic times.

Archeological remains from the Hellenistic and the Byzantine eras have been found.

=== Ottoman era ===
In 1596, Budrus appeared in Ottoman tax registers as being in the Nahiya of Ramla of the Liwa of Gaza. It had a population of 46 Muslim households and paid taxes on wheat, barley, olives or summer crops, goats or beehives and a press for olives or grapes; a total of 3,608 akçe. 7/24 of the revenue went to a Waqf.

In 1838, Budrus was counted as a Muslim village in the Gaza District, noted from the tower of the White Mosque of Ramleh.

In 1870, Victor Guérin saw Budrus from a distance, situated on a high hill. He was told that to the west of this village, on a neighboring hill, there were ruins with the name of Khirbet Budrus. An official Ottoman village list from about the same year, 1870, showed that Ebdus had a total of 28 houses and a population of 93, though the population count included only men. It also noted that it was located by Qibya and Ni'lin.

In 1882, PEF's Survey of Western Palestine described Budrus as "a small village, with olive-groves and cisterns. It has near it two sacred places (maqams), and a graveyard near one (Imam 'Aly) on the west."

=== British Mandate era ===
In the 1922 census of Palestine conducted by the British Mandate authorities, Budrus had a population of 334; all Muslims, increasing in the 1931 census to 430 Muslims in a total of 98 houses.

In the 1945 statistics the population was 510, all Muslims, while the total land area was 7,935 dunams, according to an official land and population survey. Of this, 636 dunums were plantation or irrigated, 2,412 were allotted to cereals, while 19 dunams were built-up (urban) areas.

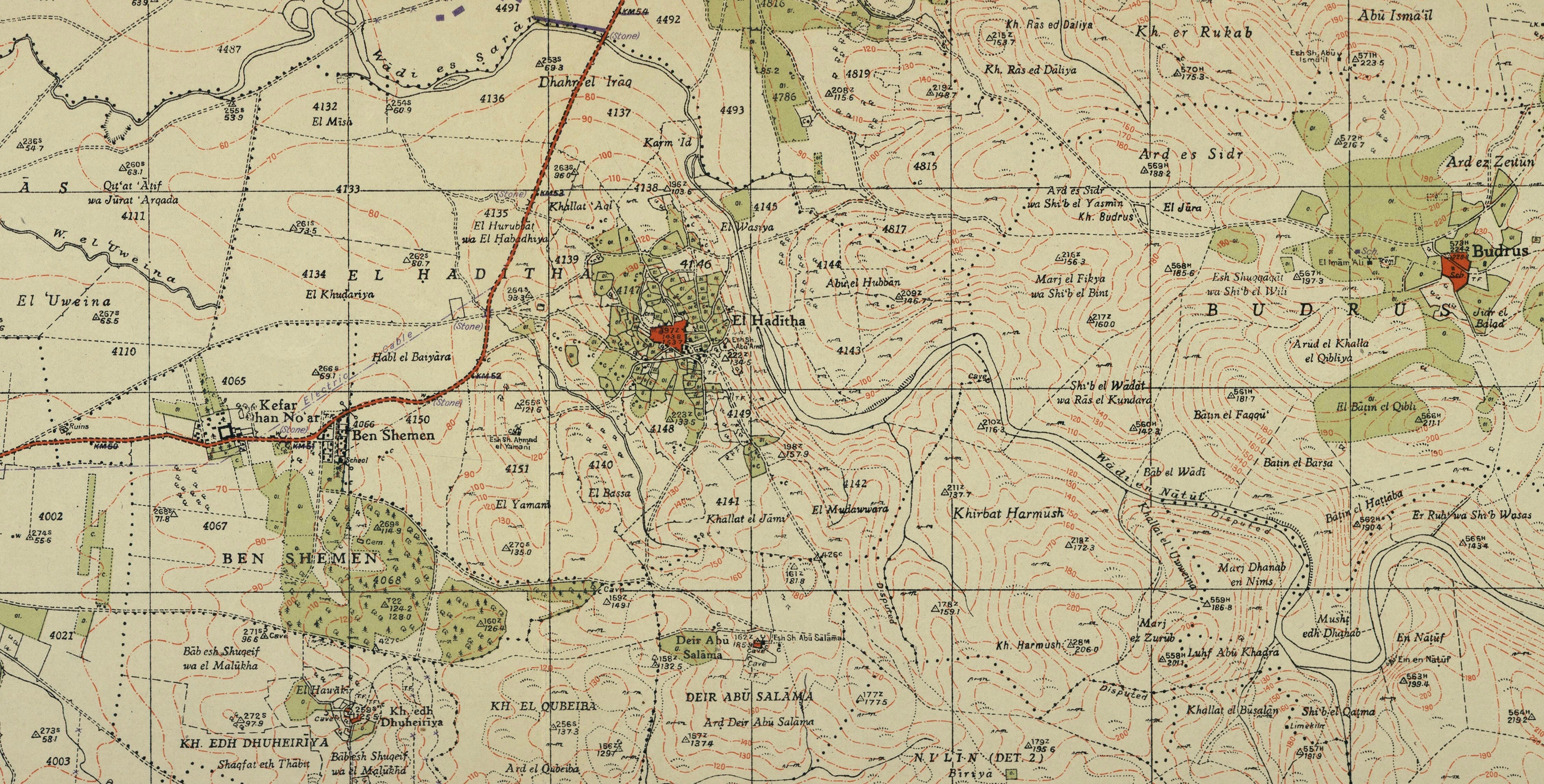
Budrus 1942 1:20,000

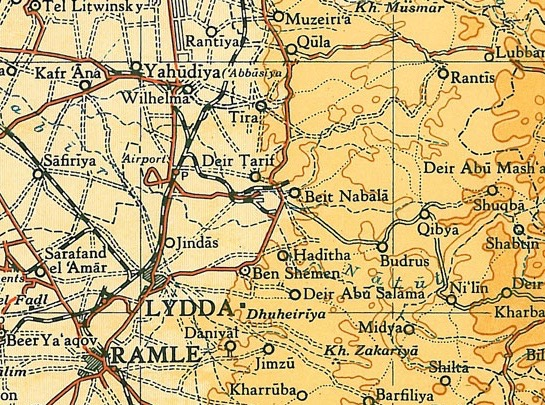
Budrus 1945 1:250,000

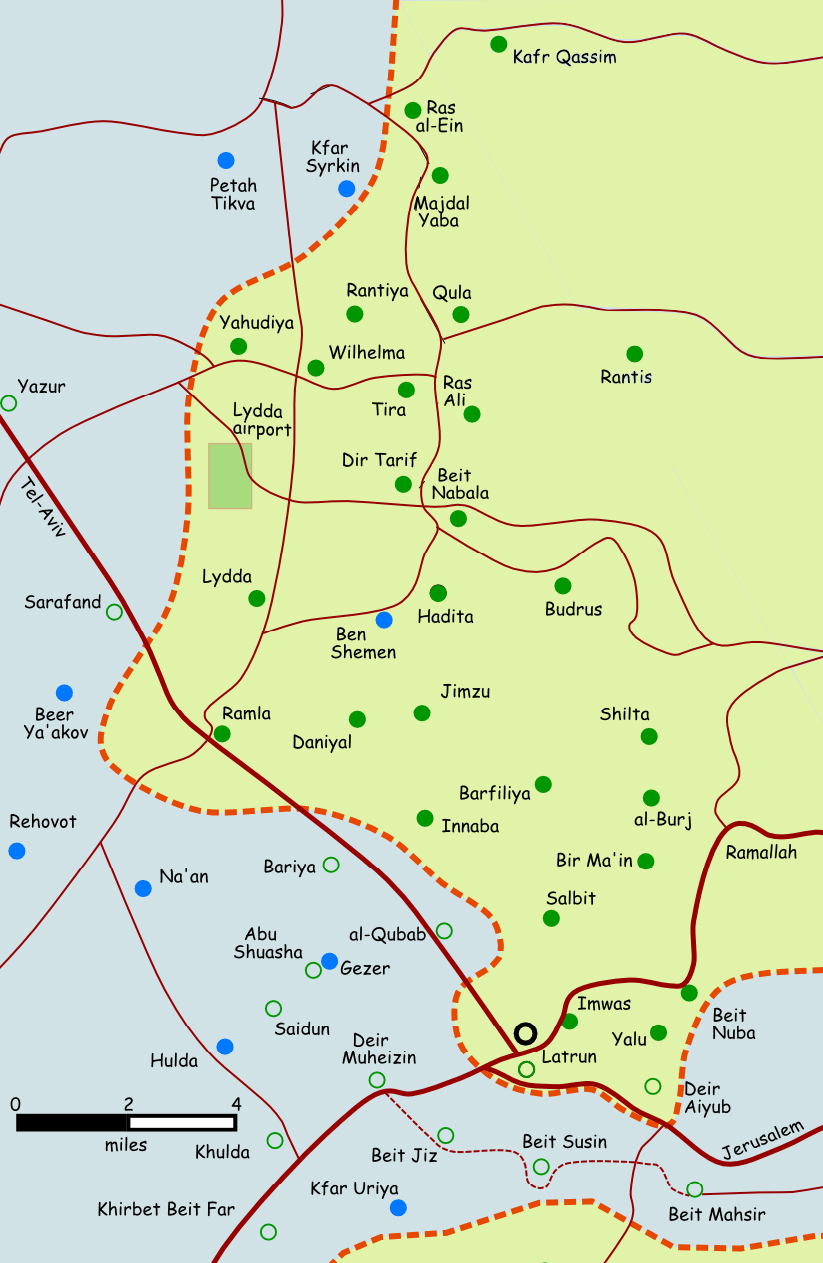
Depopulated villages in the Ramle Subdistrict

=== Jordanian era ===
In the wake of the 1948 Arab–Israeli War, and after the 1949 Armistice Agreements, Budrus came under Jordanian rule.

The Jordanian census of 1961 found 776 inhabitants in Budrus.

=== 1967-present ===
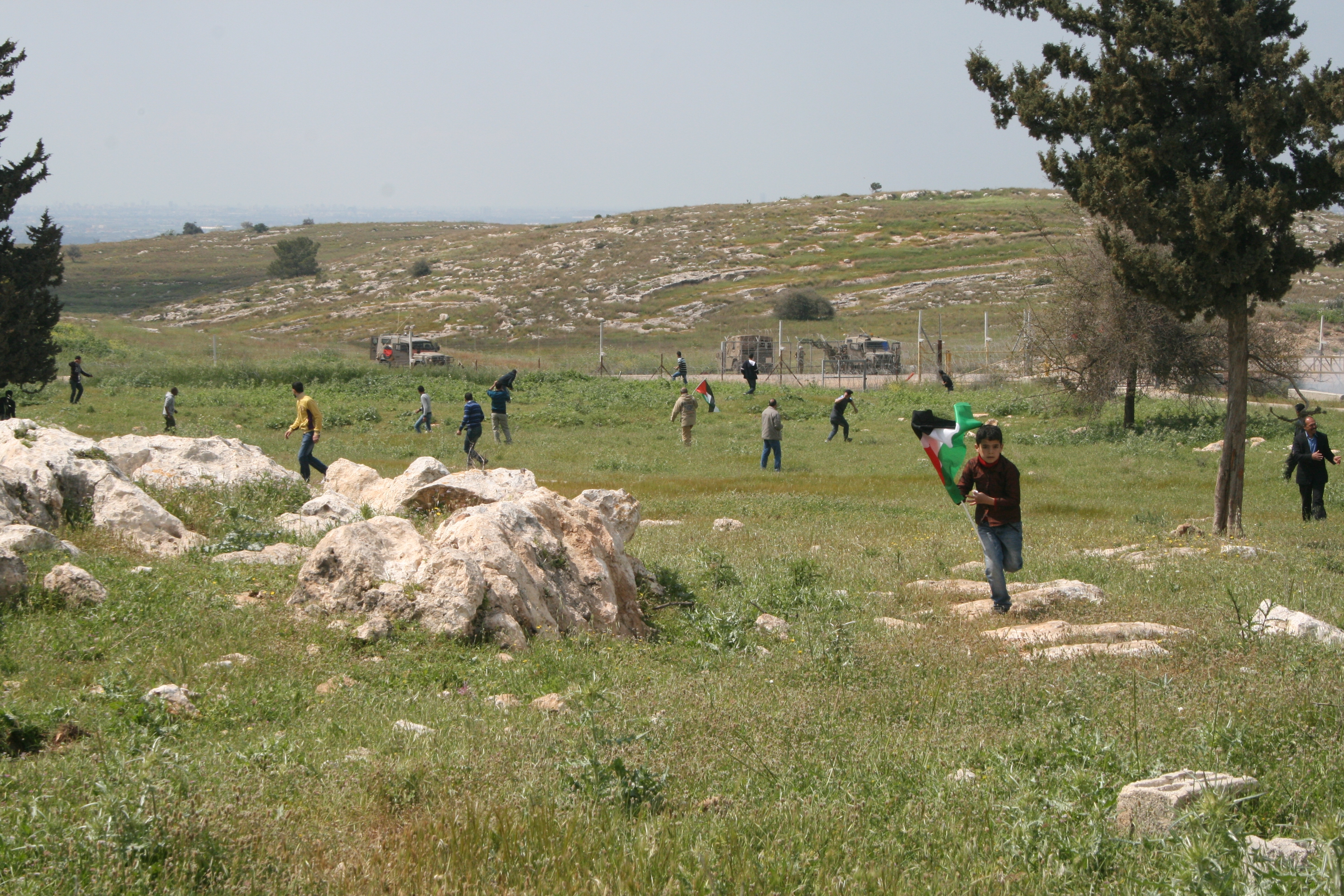
Land day protest in Budrus, March 2012

Since the Six-Day War in 1967, Budrus has been under Israeli occupation.

After the 1995 accords, 11.2% of Budrus’s land was classified as Area B, the remaining 88.8% as Area C. Israel has confiscated land from Budrus for the construction of the Israeli West Bank barrier, surrounding the village to the north and west, cutting off many villagers from their land. Frequent protests against the wall have occurred since 2003.

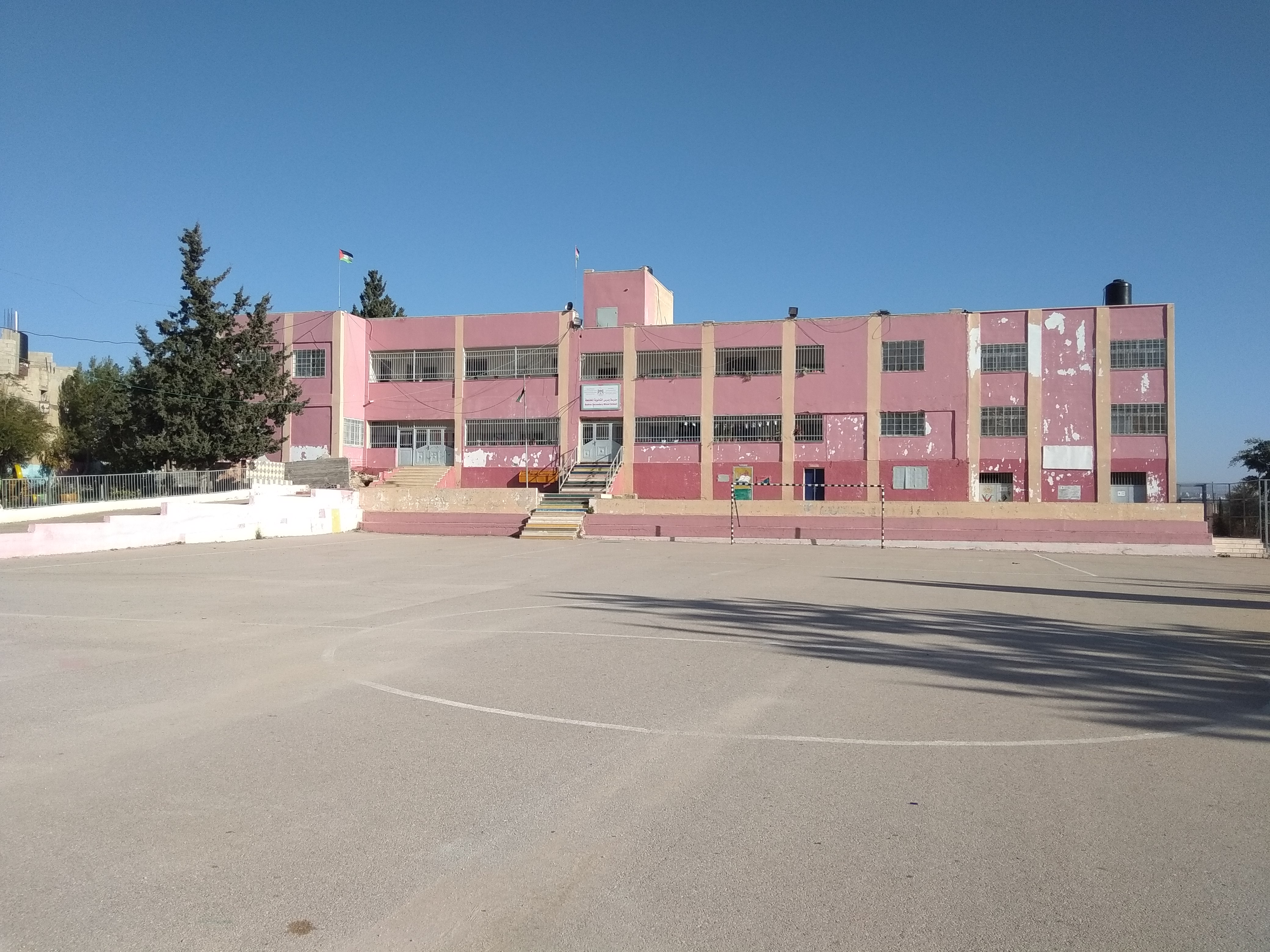
High school in Budrus

A boy from the village, 16-year-old Samir Awad, was shot to death in February 2013 near the Israeli West Bank barrier, where he reportedly had gone with friends to throw stones at soldiers. According to an investigation by B'tselem, he was shot while fleeing, once in the leg, and then further, while attempting to run away, once in the back and the head. A military investigation made a preliminary finding that the soldiers had fired in contravention of open-fire regulations. The house of his family was later subject to assault with concussion grenades, injuring several members, while another son, Abed, was arrested and taken to an unknown destination. In 2018, the Israeli prosecution decided not to charge the Israeli soldiers involved.

== See also ==
- Budrus - a film about the non-violent protests of Budrus residents against the building of the Israeli West Bank barrier in the village.

== Bibliography ==
- Barron, J.B., ed. (1923). Palestine: Report and General Abstracts of the Census of 1922. Government of Palestine.
- Conder, C.R.; Kitchener, H.H. (1882). The Survey of Western Palestine: Memoirs of the Topography, Orography, Hydrography, and Archaeology. Vol. 2. London: Committee of the Palestine Exploration Fund.
- Conder, Francis Roubiliac; Conder, C.R. (1880). A handbook to the Bible: being a guide to the study of the Holy Scriptures: derived from ancient monuments and modern exploration. A. D. F. Randolph & company.
- Dauphin, C. (1998). La Palestine byzantine, Peuplement et Populations. BAR International Series 726 (in French). Vol. III : Catalogue. Oxford: Archeopress. ISBN 0-860549-05-4.
- Government of Jordan, Department of Statistics (1964). First Census of Population and Housing. Volume I: Final Tables; General Characteristics of the Population (PDF).
- Government of Palestine, Department of Statistics (1945). Village Statistics, April, 1945.
- Guérin, V. (1875). Description Géographique Historique et Archéologique de la Palestine (in French). Vol. 2: Samarie, pt. 2. Paris: L'Imprimerie Nationale.
- Hadawi, S. (1970). Village Statistics of 1945: A Classification of Land and Area ownership in Palestine. Palestine Liberation Organization Research Center.
- Hartmann, M. (1883). "Die Ortschaftenliste des Liwa Jerusalem in dem türkischen Staatskalender für Syrien auf das Jahr 1288 der Flucht (1871)". Zeitschrift des Deutschen Palästina-Vereins. 6: 102–149.
- Hütteroth, W.-D.; Abdulfattah, K. (1977). Historical Geography of Palestine, Transjordan and Southern Syria in the Late 16th Century. Erlanger Geographische Arbeiten, Sonderband 5. Erlangen, Germany: Vorstand der Fränkischen Geographischen Gesellschaft. ISBN 3-920405-41-2.
- Korenfeld, Israel (2008-04-03). "Budrus (South)" (120). Hadashot Arkheologiyot – Excavations and Surveys in Israel.
- Mills, E., ed. (1932). Census of Palestine 1931. Population of Villages, Towns and Administrative Areas. Jerusalem: Government of Palestine.
- Palmer, E.H. (1881). The Survey of Western Palestine: Arabic and English Name Lists Collected During the Survey by Lieutenants Conder and Kitchener, R. E. Transliterated and Explained by E.H. Palmer. Committee of the Palestine Exploration Fund.
- Re'em, Amit (2008-03-27). "Budrus (West)" (120). Hadashot Arkheologiyot – Excavations and Surveys in Israel.
- Robinson, E.; Smith, E. (1841). Biblical Researches in Palestine, Mount Sinai and Arabia Petraea: A Journal of Travels in the year 1838. Vol. 3. Boston: Crocker & Brewster.
- Socin, A. (1879). "Alphabetisches Verzeichniss von Ortschaften des Paschalik Jerusalem". Zeitschrift des Deutschen Palästina-Vereins. 2: 135–163.
- Tsafrir, Y.; Leah Di Segni; Judith Green (1994). (TIR): Tabula Imperii Romani: Judaea, Palaestina. Jerusalem: Israel Academy of Sciences and Humanities. ISBN 965-208-107-8.
