= Budrus (film) =

- Theatrical release poster
- Directed by: Julia Bacha
- Written by: Julia Bacha
- Produced by: Ronit Avni; Darius Fisher; Julia Bacha; Rula Salameh
- Starring: Ayed Morrar; Iltezam Morrar; Kobi Snitz; Ahmed Awwad; Yasmine Levy; Doron Spielman
- Cinematography: Julia Bacha
- Edited by: Geeta Gandbhir; Julia Bacha
- Music by: Kareem Roustom
- Production company: Just Vision
- Distributed by: Balcony Releasing; Typecast Releasing
- Release dates: December 13, 2009 (DIFF); October 8, 2010 (United States)
- Running time: 70 minutes
- Countries: Israel; Occupied Palestinian Territory; United States
- Languages: Arabic; Hebrew; English

Budrus is a 2009 Israeli/Palestinian/American documentary film directed by Julia Bacha, produced by Ronit Avni, Rula Salameh, and Julia Bacha, and with a screenplay by Bacha. The film is about non-violent demonstrations conducted by the residents of Budrus (a Palestinian town in the Ramallah and al-Bireh Governorate) during the early 2000s to protest against the building of the Israeli West Bank barrier inside of the village.

Budrus debuted on the festival circuit at the Dubai International Film Festival on December 13, 2009. Its theatrical release was on September 24, 2010, in the UK. and on October 8, 2010, in the United States (New York).

== Plot ==
Jordana Horn in The Jewish Daily Forward states that:

Budrus [is] a documentary by Julia Bacha that examines one West Bank town’s reaction to Israel’s construction of the security barrier. The town, with a population of 1,500, was set to be divided and encircled by the barrier, losing 300 acres of land and 3,000 olive trees. These trees were not only critical for economic survival but also sacred to the town’s intergenerational history. The film tells the story of Ayed Morrar, a Palestinian whose work for Fatah had led to five detentions in Israeli jails, but whose momentous strategic decision that the barrier would be best opposed by nonviolent resistance had far-reaching ramifications.

== Cast ==
- Ayed Morrar: Leader of the non-violent movement in Budrus, "uniting all local Palestinian political factions, including Hamas and Fatah, and encouraging hundreds of Israelis to cross into the Occupied Palestinian Territories and demonstrate in support of his village."
- Iltezam Morrar: The fifteen-year-old daughter of Ayed, whose "fearlessness galvanizes the entire village and affirms the importance of women in the movement. The demonstrations in Budrus marked the first time that Iltezam, like most of the village’s youth, met Israelis who were not soldiers or settlers."
- Kobi Snitz: Israeli activist who participated in the demonstrations in Budrus.
- Ahmed Awwad: A member of Hamas who aided Ayed in promoting "nonviolence as a strategic tool, best suited to achieve the village’s aims." In response to the involvement of Israeli activists in the Budrus demonstrations, Awwad stated, "We had already heard that there were some Israelis who wanted peace with the Palestinians. But these demonstrations exceeded expectations. . . . In these marches I saw these Israeli voices in real life; it wasn’t just something I heard about."
- Yasmine Levy: Squad commander of the Israel Border Police who "develops a complex relationship with the women in the village who call her by name in their chants."
- Doron Spielman: Spokesman for the Israeli army who doesn't believe that the non-violent protests will result in change.

== Themes and background ==
Nonviolent, civil disobedience is not new to the Palestinian territories. It has been used, historians say, in various forms and with mixed results from the early 1920s through the second intifada. But what makes the Palestinian peaceniks of Budrus different is that they explicitly define their movement in opposition to violence, condemning even stone—throwing, long a symbol of Palestinian resistance. Also unique: women in Budrus asked to march at the front of the protests, as did Israeli and international peace activists. All, analysts say, complicated the efforts of the Israeli security forces, which resorted to using force against unarmed women, foreign activists, and Israeli civilians.
– R.M. Schneiderman and Joanna Chen, Newsweek

In 2004, The Nation reported that if the planned construction of the Israeli West Bank barrier continued along its designated course, "the 1,200 residents of Budrus—the vast majority of whom depend on agriculture for work—will lose a large portion of their fields. An Israeli bulldozer has already carved a preliminary path, and uprooted trees lie in its wake. According to the official map released by Israel's Defense Ministry, the proposed route of the separation barrier will not only pass through this patch of land but will also loop around to encircle Budrus and eight nearby villages, creating a closed enclave with a population of 25,000. Once the area is sealed, access to fields, offices, construction sites, university classrooms, friends and relatives outside the enclave will be restricted." In response, the residents began to hold non-violent protests. Haaretz stated that although curfews were established to prevent the protests, "mainly young men violated the curfew and walked to the olive grove, to prevent the bulldozers from doing their work. Up to this week, the bulldozers have not returned to work – after they already uprooted about 60 olive trees."

In a 2010 interview with The Jewish News Weekly of Northern California, Budrus producer Ronit Avni stated that the film was made in response to questions concerning the existence of Palestinian non-violence movements. She further argued that, "often the phrase that followed [this] question was something along the lines of, ‘If only Palestinians adopted nonviolence, there would be peace.’ The film explores what it looks like when a Palestinian nonviolence movement emerges. And what is the Israeli response?" In another interview with the Montreal Mirror, she added that after investigating instances of Palestinians and Israelis working together towards peace through non-violence, "All of our research kept leading us back to Budrus [...] And most Israelis and Palestinians did not know the story of this village."

== Release ==
Budrus initially debuted on the festival circuit in 2009 at the Dubai International Film Festival. It also played at the Tribeca Film Festival.

Budrus was the Official Selection at film festivals worldwide including the International Thessaloniki Film Festival, Hot Docs Canadian International Documentary Festival, Sydney Film Festival, Dokufest, Rhode Island International Film Festival, EBS International Documentary Festival, Festival do Rio, Bergen International Film Festival, Mumbai International Film Festival, and The St. Louis International Film Festival.

It has screened at other festivals such as the San Francisco Jewish Film Festival and the 14th Annual DocuWeeks film festival in Los Angeles and New York City.

== Reception ==
=== Critical response ===
As of January 15, 2011, Budrus received on Rotten Tomatoes an overall rating of 95% from all critics (19 fresh and 1 rotten).

During the first week of its release in the UK (September 24, 2010), Budrus ranked No. 1 on the British-based film review website, The Critic List, which includes top critics from Total Film, The Guardian, TimeOut London, Little White Lies – Independent Film Magazine, and The Evening Standard. Tom Dawson of Total Film gave the film four stars and called it "a timely testimony to the power of peaceful resistance." Peter Bradshaw of The Guardian gave Budrus four out of five stars stating that "this involving film is an eye-opener." He also argues that "what is so arresting about Bacha's film is that it shows something about the Israeli wall that I hadn't grasped. It doesn't just simply separate the Israelis from the Palestinians, but wanders on to the Palestinian territory, meandering and looping around: the idea is not merely to stop movement into Israel but covertly to impose paralysis within the Palestinian zone itself." Tom Huddleston of TimeOut London gave it four out of five stars and argues that, "In refusing to romanticise the villagers or demonise their aggressors, she presents a stark and wholly believable portrait of the Middle East conflict in microcosm, while her welcome focus on character over political point-scoring gives Budrus a weighty emotional kick." Liz Haycroft of Little White Lies – Independent Film Magazine gave Budrus three out of five stars and states, "By incorporating interviews with an Israeli Border Police captain and a spokesman from the military police, Budrus presents a relatively balanced view of the dispute, particularly for those unfamiliar with the regional politics. And yet from the very beginning, it’s difficult to fathom how one country can enter a region and declare parts of it their own, without expecting some kind of resistance. The people of Budrus, and their choice of peaceful protest, can only be admired." Derek Malcolm of The Evening Standard gave the film four out of five stars and notes that the "film seems designed to prove what can be done by relatively peaceful means. But it is at its best when we see how Morror gradually moves into a position of moral strength. You can scarcely believe the foolishness of the Israeli authorities, but you never get the sense that the film is taking sides." In addition, Budrus received four stars from The Daily Telegraph and the Financial Times.

In the United States, Budrus was listed as a "Critic's Pick" by New York Magazine and Ann Hornaday of The Washington Post. Hornaday later questioned why Budrus was "inexplicably left off" the Oscars nomination list for best documentary stating that "if there was an Arab-Israeli "slot" in the noms, my nod would have gone to Budrus." Kenneth Turan of the Los Angeles Times called Budrus a "surprisingly heartening" film and stated that, "What's most gratifying about "Budrus" is that the film enables us to feel some of the same emotions the participants experienced." Michael Phillips of the Chicago Tribune gave Budrus three and a half stars referring to it as "Julia Bacha's fine, humane documentary" that "makes you believe people can get things done, if they think in terms of coalitions and principles and methods other than brute force." Mike Hale of The New York Times called Budrus an "engrossing and sometimes inspiring" film and stated that it is, "Eyes on the Prize with olive trees." Ella Taylor of The Village Voice referred to Budrus as, "Julia Bacha’s mostly fair-minded documentary." Alissa Simon of Variety called Budrus a "poignant" and "inspiring" documentary. While she argued that the "pic fails to provide a sense of chronology" or the impact of the demonstrations on everyday life, Simon also stated that, "these are small criticisms when compared to the pic's useful analysis of what constitutes model conflict resistance." Chuck Bowen of Slant Magazine gave the film two and half out of four stars arguing that, "Budrus is passionately, more-than-competently made, but it's a civics lesson that doesn't quite shake you to your core." Nick Schager of Time Out New York gave the film two out of five stars and argued that, "documentaries warrant viewpoints, but they should also provide perspective on more than one side of a contentious issue."

=== Accolades ===
==== 2011 ====
- Won: Amnesty's Matter of Act Human Rights Award, Movies That Matter Film Festival
- Won: Jury Award for Excellence in Documenting a Human Rights Issue, Bellingham Human Rights Film Festival
- Won: The Henry Hampton Award for Excellence in Film and Digital Media
- Won: The Ridenhour Documentary Film Prize

==== 2010 ====
- Won: Tribeca Film Festival – Special Jury Mention
- Won: 60th Berlin International Film Festival – Panorama Audience Award Second Prize
- Won: Bahamas International Film Festival – Spirit of Freedom Documentary Award
- Won: San Francisco International Film Festival – Audience Award
- Won: Jerusalem Film Festival – Honorable Mention for Best Documentary in the Spirit of Freedom Award
- Won: Silverdocs – Witness Award
- Won: Traverse City Film Festival – Founders Prize, Best of Fest, Nonfiction
- Won: Bergen International Film Festival – Checkpoints Award
- Won: Documenta Madrid 10 – Honorable Mention of the Jury
- Won: Festival des Libertés – Festival des Libertés Prize
- Won: Pesaro Film Festival – Amnesty Italia Award

==== 2009 ====
- Cultural Bridge Gala, 6th Dubai International Film Festival

== See also ==
- Budrus
