= Naila and the Uprising =

2017 documentary film by Julia Bacha

Naila and the Uprising is a 2017 documentary film focusing on the story of Palestinian feminist Naila Ayesh and other Palestinian women who played prominent roles in the First Intifada in the late 1980s.

== Background ==
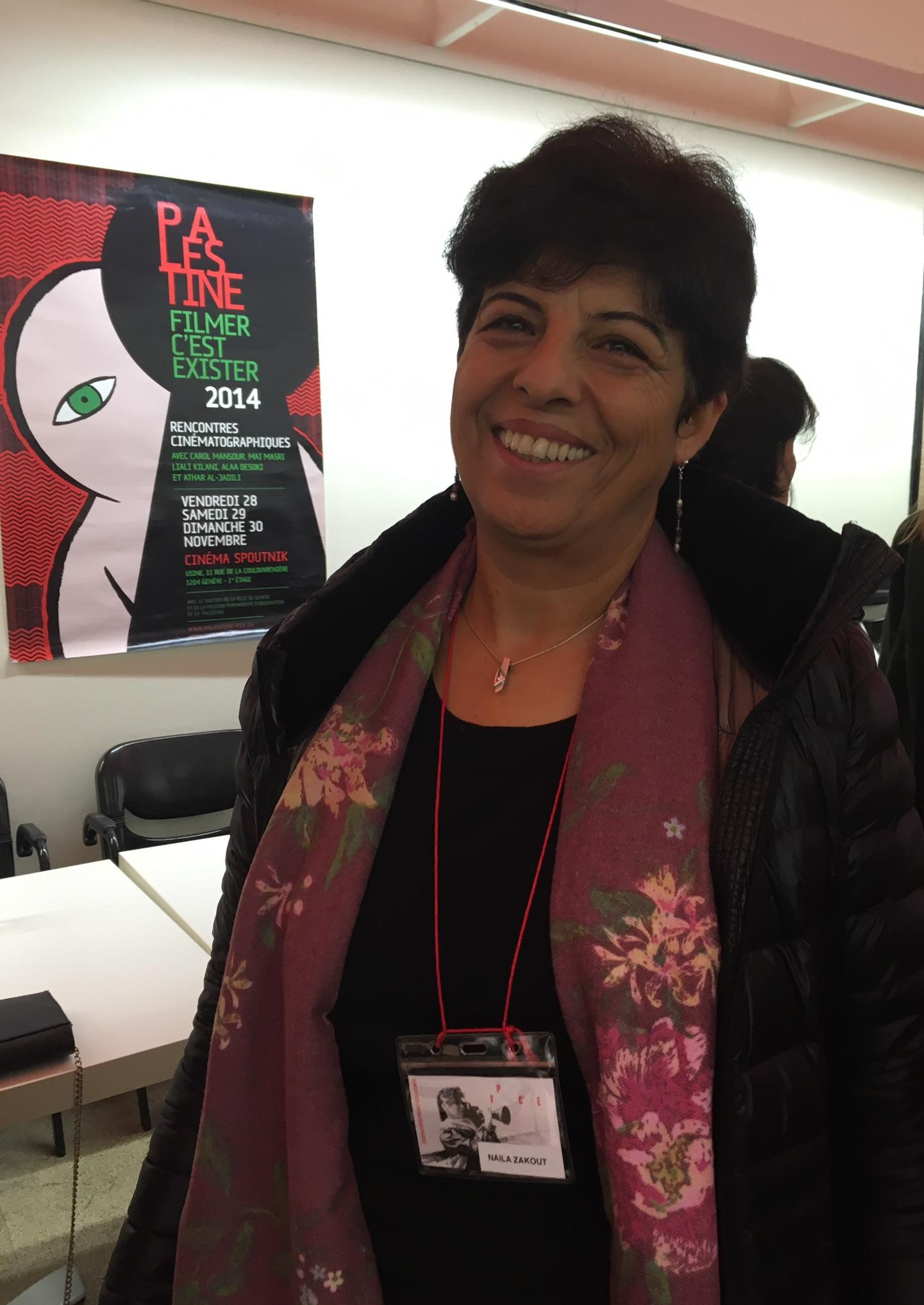
Naila in 2019

Naila Ayesh is a Palestinian feminist from Nablus, West Bank, born in 1961. As a young adult in the 1980s, she joined the left-wing Democratic Front for the Liberation of Palestine. In 1987, while pregnant, she was arrested by the Israeli Shin Bet and detained in the Moscovia Detention Centre in Jerusalem. There, she was tortured until she miscarried and was subsequently denied medical treatment. Following a report by a Hadashot journalist exposing the torture, Ayesh was released later in the 1987. She later played a role in organising protests during the First Intifada and co-founded the Women’s Affairs Center in the Gaza Strip.

== Summary ==
The documentary was directed by Brazilian director Julia Bacha and produced by Just Vision.

Suhad Babaa of Just Vision stated that Palestinian women "stepped into leadership positions when thousands of men were arrested, deported or killed during Israel’s repression of the uprising," but that the role of both women and nonviolent resistance in the First Intifada has been overlooked. Bacha has stated that she "didn’t actually launch the project wanting to make a feminist movie," but that the Intifada grew to the size it did "was because women played such a strong leadership role, and that emerged in the process of the research we conducted."

== Reception ==
The Hollywood Reporter reviewed the documentary as "by turns startling and dismaying," saying that it "paints an indelible picture of how, with many men deported or arrested, women stepped into the arena of political and social organizing, only to be told their role was over when Yasser Arafat returned from exile to form the Palestinian Authority in 1994 with a crew of all-male leaders." Khelil Bouarrouj of the Institute for Palestine Studies has described the documentary as "the docudrama on Palestine for the MeToo movement," saying that the Palestinian women of the First Intifada "came damn close to victory until the boy's club led by the Old Man pushed aside the very women who embody Palestinian hope." Jennifer Creery of the Hong Kong Free Press stated that the documentary "at times makes for uncomfortable viewing" and was "a harrowing story, beautified by intricate illustrations that depict a tale of bitter loss, resistance and unwavering hope."
