= Ronit Avni =

Israeli filmmaker and activist

- Occupations: Filmmaker, human rights advocate and media strategist
- Writing career
- Genre: Documentary
- Notable works: Budrus; Encounter Point

Ronit Avni is a Canadian entrepreneur, tech founder, human rights advocate, and Peabody Award-winning film director and producer.

== Early life and education ==
Avni was born and raised in Canada. She graduated with honors with an A.B. in political science from Vassar College.

== Career ==
Avni is the founder and executive director of Just Vision, a nonprofit organization that creates digital media, award-winning films (Naila and the Uprising, Budrus, My Neighborhood, Encounter Point), news analysis and public education campaigns in North America and the Middle East. As Executive Director of Just Vision, Avni raised over $10M, managed a diverse team and her films were seen by tens of millions of viewers on TV and online globally. She was a frequent speaker in think tanks, community, government, international, educational and media settings and is known for creating content that addresses sensitive geopolitical topics.

Avni directed and produced the documentary film, Encounter Point, which received the 2006 San Francisco International Film Festival Audience Award for Best Documentary and was an official selection at the Tribeca Film Festival, Hot Docs, Atlanta Film Festival, Vancouver International Film Festival, Dubai International Film Festival and Jerusalem International Film Festival. Encounter Point has screened at the United Nations and in Gaza, Tel Aviv, Jenin and more than 200 cities worldwide and has won 5 international awards. Avni appeared on The Oprah Winfrey Show in 2005 and her work was featured on Oprah.com, and on Christiane Amanpour’s show, Amanpour, on CNN. She produced the documentary film Budrus, which received the Berlinale's Panorama Audience Award Second Prize, the Special Jury Mention at the Tribeca Film Festival and the Audience Award at the San Francisco International Film Festival in 2010. Budrus premiered at the Cultural Bridge Gala at the Dubai International Film Festival in December 2009. It won the Ridenhour Prize and the 2012 PUMA Creative Impact prize. She co-produced Naila and the Uprising, which premiered at DocNYC, IDFA and the Dubai International Film Festival. Her short film My Neighborhood won a Peabody Award.

Avni trained human rights defenders worldwide to incorporate film and digital media into their advocacy campaigns while working for the human rights organization, WITNESS. Avni has trained non-governmental organizations to produce videos as a tool for public education and grassroots mobilizing, as a deterrent to further abuse and as evidence before courts and tribunals. She co-edited the book Video for Change: A Guide for Advocacy and Activism, with staff from WITNESS. She now sits on the WITNESS Board, chairing the Program Committee as WITNESS advises activists and technology companies on the ethical uses of video.

Avni is the founder of Localized, a platform that connects college students and aspiring professionals in emerging markets to global professionals who can offer career guidance and expertise in languages they share. Launching in 2018 in Arabic and English, Localized was selected as one of 12 companies to join the NYU Steinhardt Edtech Accelerator, powered by StartEd in collaboration with Rethink Education Fund. She was a finalist for the 2018 Next Billion Prize at the Global Education and Skills Forum in Dubai, overseen by TechCrunch Editor-at-Large Mike Butcher. A 2018 World Economic Forum Halcyon Fellow, she has spoken and written about the intersection of technology, workforce readiness, education and migration for the World Economic Forum and The National's Future Forum in Abu Dhabi.

Avni is a Young Global Leader, sponsored by the World Economic Forum, a Term Member at the Council on Foreign Relations and has been recognized with a variety of honors, including the Search for Common Ground's Common Ground Award, the Circles of Change Award, Auburn Seminary's Lives of Commitment Award, the Trailblazer Award from the National Council for Research for Women and the Daughters for Life Award. She sits on the jury of both the MacArthur Foundation’s 100 & Change Competition and the Global Teacher Prize. She has trained hundreds of business leaders, MBA students, nonprofit leaders and civil servants to speak persuasively to the media, on stage and in executive settings with KNP Communications.

== Director ==
- 2006: Encounter Point (Director, Producer, Executive Producer)

== Producer ==
- 2000-2002: Now is the Hardest Time (Associate Producer)
- 2001: Forgotten People (Associate Producer)
- 2001: Expelled (Associate Producer)
- 2001: Postcards from Peje (Associate Producer)
- 2001: Refuge (co-producer)
- 2001: A Right to Justice (Associate Producer)
- 2001: The Road to Pineapple (Associate Producer)
- 2001: Rule of the Gun in Sugarland (Associate Producer)
- 2001: Set Apart (Senior Producer)
- 2001: The Soul Eaters (Senior Producer)
- 2001: Terra Nas Nossas Mãos (Supervising Producer)
- 2001: Youth Interrupted (Associate Producer, 2001)
- 2002: Rise (Writer/Producer)
- 2002: Following Antigone: Forensic Anthropology and Human Rights Investigations (Associate Producer)
- 2002: Fueling Abuse: Foreign Investment and Terror in Burma (Associate Producer)
- 2002: No Place to Go (Associate Producer)
- 2002: Voices from Silence (Associate Producer)
- 2003: Garifunas Holding Ground (Writer/Producer)
- 2006: Encounter Point (Director, Producer, Executive Producer)
- 2009: Budrus (Producer)
- 2011: Home Front: Portraits from Sheikh Jarrah (Co-Producer, Executive Producer)
- 2012: My Neighbourhood (Executive Producer)
- 2017: Naila and the Uprising (co-producer)

== Books and articles ==
- Avni, Ronit. "From Budrus to Bilin: Arresting Heroes." Huffington Post, October 14, 2010.
- Video for Change: A How-To Guide on Using Video in Advocacy and Activism (by Sam Gregory, Gillian Caldwell, Ronit Avni and Thomas Harding)

== Awards and nominations ==
In 2006, the film Encounter Point was:

- Winner, Audience Award, Best Documentary at San Francisco International Film Festival
- Winner, Spirit of Freedom Jury Prize at Bahamas International Film Festival
- Voted Top 5 Audience Pick at Kansas International Film Festival
- Opening Night at Vancouver International Film Festival
- Winner, Best Musical Score at BEND International Film Festival
- Director's Cut Work-in-progress True/False Film Festival
- Director's Cut Work-in-progress Screening Search for Common Ground
- Winner, Henry Hampton Award for Excellence in Film and Digital Media

In 2010-11, the film Budrus was:

- Winner, Panorama Audience Award Second Prize, Berlin International Film Festival
- Winner, Special Jury Mention, Tribeca Film Festival
- Winner, Audience Award, San Francisco International Film Festival
- Winner, Honorable Mention for Best Documentary in the Spirit of Freedom Award, Jerusalem International Film Festival
- Winner, Witness Award at Silverdocs Film Festival,
- Winner, Honorable Mention of the Jury, Documenta Madrid
- Winner, Amnesty Italia Award, Pesaro Film Festival,
- Winner, Founders Prize, Best of Fest, Nonfiction, Traverse City Film Festival
- Winner, Checkpoints Award, Bergen International Film Festival
- Winner, Festival des Libertés Prize, Festival des Libertés
- Winner, Spirit of Freedom Documentary Award, Bahamas International Film Festival
- Winner, Amnesty's Matter of Act Human Rights Award, Movies That Matter Film Festival
- Winner, Jury Award for Excellence in Documenting a Human Rights Issue, Bellingham Human Rights Film Festival (2011)

In 2009-11, Ronit Avni was:

- Winner, King Hussein Leadership Prize, 2009
- Winner, Circles of Change Award, 2010
- Winner, The Common Ground Award, 2010
- Winner, The Henry Hampton Award for Excellence in Film and Digital Media, 2011
- Winner, The Ridenhour Documentary Film Prize, 2011
- Winner, Next Billion Ed Tech Prize, 2018
