= Lake Placid Film Festival =

Film festival held in Lake Placid, New York

The Lake Placid Film Festival is an annual Film Festival held in Lake Placid, New York. The Festival, previously known as the Lake Placid Film Forum, has played host to famous film personalities such as directors Paul Schrader and Martin Scorsese. Guest lists have also included actors Parker Posey, Lucie Laurier and Steve Buscemi along with writer Richard Russo and film critic Gerald Peary.
