= Encounter Point =

- Directed by: Ronit Avni; Julia Bacha
- Cinematography: Ronit Avni; Julia Bacha; Mickey Elkeles; Labib Jazmawi
- Edited by: Julia Bacha
- Music by: Kareem Roustom
- Release date: 2006
- Running time: 85 minutes
- Country: United States
- Languages: Arabic; English; Hebrew
- Budget: $300,000

Encounter Point is a film directed by Ronit Avni and Julia Bacha. It depicts different families that have been affected by the violence in Israel between Israelis and Palestinians. In this film, Just Vision, a non-profit organization, follows these families for 16 months. It begins this journey by documenting the ongoing troubles between the Israelis and Palestinians. The team conducted 475 preliminary interviews and did two years of research before embarking on this 16-month journey. The crew traveled throughout Israel, from Tel Mond, Tulkarem, Hebron, and Haifa. These parents and loved ones have been attempting to end the violence by joining, or beginning their own peace organizations and awareness campaigns.

== Plot ==
One mother that is introduced early on in the film is Robi Damelin. Damelin’s son David was a soldier in the Israeli army that had been shot by a sniper while working at a checkpoint. The soldiers had been sent to protect an Israeli settlement on Palestinian territory. After learning of her son's loss, Damelin joined the Bereaved Families Forum, where she was able to meet other Palestinian and Israeli families that had been through the same losses. There she worked closely with the families from different backgrounds and began to advocate peace between Palestinians and Israelis. She continues to work for an end to the conflict.

The production team also follows Ali Abu Awwad to examine his stance on non-violence. After being shot in his lower body by an Israeli settler he was sent to Saudi Arabia for medical treatment. While healing in Saudi Arabia, Ali’s brother Yusef had been killed by an Israeli militant. After the news of his brother's death Ali Abu Awwad teamed up with the Bereaved Families Forum to work with Israelis and Palestinians who together campaigned for non-violence.

Shlomo Zagman, who grew up in an Israeli settlement most of his life is another character in the documentary. Along with the settlers from his hometown, Shlomo, and other Israeli settlers, are extremists that believe that all Palestinians should be deported to the neighboring Arab countries. The movie illuminates this point as we see how Shlomo and his wife transform, despite the meandering resistance of his parents and hometown, to become founding members of the Realistic Religious Zionism group. Subsequently, Shlomo tries to encourage the people of his hometown, as well as other settlements, to withdraw from these Occupied Territories and convince them that the persistence of these settlements will be detrimental to Israel.

== Cast ==
- Ali Abu Awwad
- Robi Damelin
- Sami Al Jundi
- George Sa'adeh
- Tzvika Shahak
- Shlomo Zagman

== Crew ==
- Ronit Avni (Producer, Director)
- Nahanni Rous (Producer)
- Julia Bacha (Co-Director, Writer, Editor)
- Joline Makhlouf (Producer).

== Making of the film ==
Ronit Avni (Encounter Point director) and Julia Bacha (Encounter Point co-director) worked together to make this film. Avni founded Just Vision, the nonprofit organization that created the film, in 2004 to amplify the work of Palestinians and Israelis working to end the occupation and build a future of freedom, dignity and equality. The film followed years of research into grassroots organizing in Israel and Palestine. Bacha, who is originally from Brazil, previously co-wrote and edited Control Room, a documentary about the coverage of the Iraq war. Bacha came to New York City from Brazil in 1998 to study Middle Eastern History at Columbia University.

== Awards and acknowledgments ==
Encounter Point has won various awards in several countries.

- Audience Award winner for best documentary film in 2006 at the San Francisco International Film Festival
- Best Musical Score in the 2006 BendFilm Festival
- Rencontres Film Festival’s Audience Award winner for Best Documentary Film in 2006
- Spirit of Freedom Award in the Bahamas International Film Festival in 2006
- Winner of the Docupolis Award for Best First Documentary
- Grand Jury Prize for Best Documentary at the São Paulo Jewish Film Festival
- The film was also part of the Official Selection in the Jerusalem Film Festival, the Dubai Film Festival and the Tribeca Film Festival. Encounter Point was screened at the Boston Independent film festival on April 29, and the Harrisburg film festival in PA on May 5.
