= Julia Bacha =

Brazilian documentary filmmaker

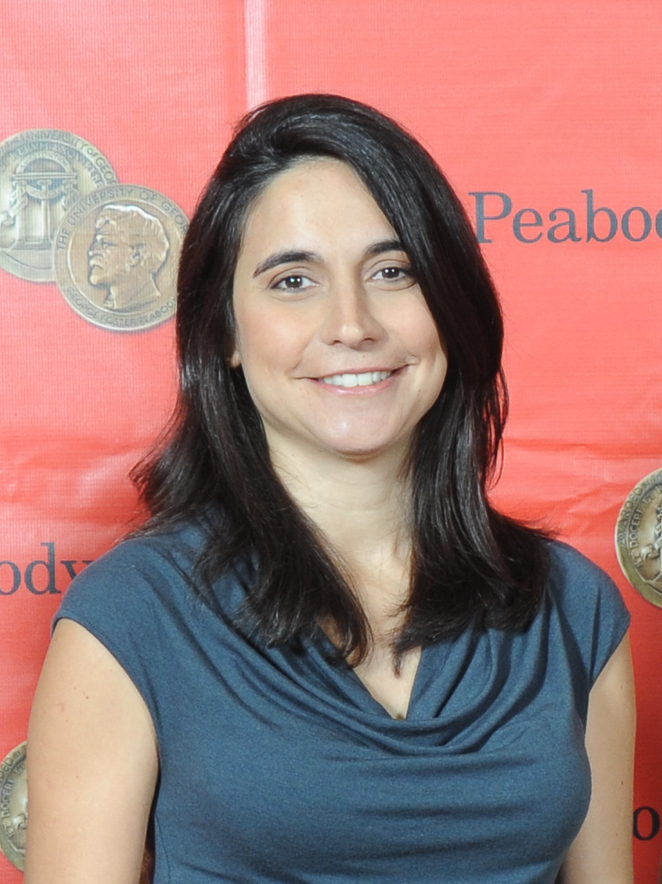
- Julia Bacha at the 72nd Annual Peabody Awards
- Born: 1980 (age 45–46); Rio de Janeiro, Brazil
- Occupations: Director, Producer, Writer
- Spouse: Lucas Welch
- Writing career
- Genre: Documentary
- Notable works: Budrus, Encounter Point, Control Room
- Website: justvision.org/staff/julia-bacha

Julia Bacha (born 1980) is a Brazilian documentary filmmaker. She has filmed under-documented stories from the Middle East including issues related to Palestine. Her 2021 film, Boycott, explores anti-boycott legislation and related freedom of speech issues.

== Background ==
Bacha was born in Rio de Janeiro, Brazil. When she was 17 she moved to the US to study Middle Eastern history and politics at Columbia University. She got accepted to Tehran University for a master's degree but could not acquire a visa, and instead went to Cairo to work on a documentary, Control Room. In 2003, she graduated from the Columbia University School of General Studies.

== Career ==
Bacha has filmed under documented stories from the Middle East.

In 2004, she was the co-writer (with director Jehane Noujaim) and editor of Control Room, a documentary about Al Jazeera. Bacha and Noujaim received a nomination for the Writers Guild of America Award for Best Documentary Screenplay for the film. Two years later, she co-directed (with Ronit Avni) the documentary Encounter Point, which was the official selection at Tribeca Film Festival, Hot Docs, Jerusalem Film Festival, Vancouver International Film Festival and San Francisco International Film Festivals, where it won the Audience Award for Best Documentary. Bacha directed the 2009 documentary Budrus, which was shown at the 60th Berlin International Film Festival and became runner up in the festival's documentary competition. Budrus won over 18 international prizes, including the 2012 PUMA Creative.Impact Award, the $50,000 prize is given to the documentary film that had the greatest impact on society.

By 2006, Bacha had become creative director at the non-profit Just Vision.

In 2013, her 2012 film My Neighbourhood won the Peabody Award and premiered online at The Guardian. In 2014, it won a Special Mention at the Social Impact Media Awards. On November 12, 2017, her film Naila and the Uprising (2017) premiered at the DOC NYC film festival.

Bacha's latest feature-length documentary, Boycott, which explores anti-BDS laws and related freedom of speech issues, premiered in November 2021 at Doc NYC. The film tells the stories of people in three states who refused to sign a pledge to not boycott Israel as a condition for receiving state funds and contracts, deciding instead to challenge their states' anti-boycott legislation as unconstitutional. The film was funded by grants from groups including Doc Society, International Documentary Association, Fork Films and the Sundance Institute.

== Filmography ==
- Control Room (2004) – Co-writer and editor
- Encounter Point (2006) – Co-director
- Budrus (2009) – Director
- Home Front: Portraits From Sheikh Jarrah (2011) – Writer and Producer
- My Neighbourhood (2012) – Co-director and Co-Producer
- Naila and the Uprising (2017) – Director
- Boycott (2021) – Director

== Awards ==
- 2003: Phi Beta Kappa prize upon graduation from Columbia University
- 2009: 2009 King Hussein Leadership Prize (co-recipient)
- 2010: Search for Common Ground Award
- 2011: Ridenhour Film Prize
- 2012: O Globo “Faz Diferença” Award
- 2017: Columbia's University Medal for Excellence

== See also ==
- Ronit Avni
- Jehane Noujaim
- Rebekah Wingert-Jabi
