= List of Palestinian women writers =

This is a list of women writers who were born in Palestine or whose writings are closely associated with that region.

== A ==
- Umayya Abu-Hanna (born 1961), Palestinian-Finnish journalist, columnist, novelist
- Hiba Abu Nada (1991–2023), Palestinian poet and novelist
- Lama Abu-Odeh (born 1962), Palestinian-American educator, non-fiction writer
- Refqa Abu-Remaileh (fl 2000s), academic and non-fiction writer
- Susan Abulhawa (born 1970), Palestinian-American best selling novelist, human rights activist, author of Mornings in Jenin
- Soraya Antonius (1932–2017), Palestinian writer, filmmaker, curator, journalist
- Samira Azzam (1927–1967), short story writer, broadcaster, translator, political activist

== B ==
- Liana Badr (born 1950), novelist, short story writer
- Ibtisam Barakat, Palestinian-American memoirist, poet, educator, author of Tasting the Sky: A Palestinian Childhood (2007)

== D ==
- Selma Dabbagh (born 1970), British-Palestinian short story writer, novelist, playwright with a strong focus on Palestine

== E ==
- Laila el-Haddad (born 1978), Kuwaiti-born Palestinian journalist, non-fiction writer
- Noura Erakat, contemporary Palestinian-American legal scholar

== F ==
- Najwa Kawar Farah (1923–2015), educator, short story writer, playwright, children's writer, novelist
- Leila Farsakh (born 1967), non-fiction writer, educator

== G ==
- Asma al-Ghul (born 1982), journalist

== H ==
- Nejmeh Khalil Habib (born 1946), novelist and non-fiction writer
- Salha Hamadin Hans Christian Andersen Award winner
- Suheir Hammad (born 1973), Palestinian-American poet, non-fiction writer
- Sheikha Helawy (born 1968), Arabic short story writer and poet
- Nadia Hijab (fl. 1988), Syrian-born Palestinian analyst, journalist, living in the United States
- Huzama Habayeb (born 1965), Kuwaiti-born Palestinian novelist, short-story writer, columnist, poet, and translator

== J ==
- Annemarie Jacir (born 1974), filmmaker, poet
- Salma Jayyusi (1925–2023), Jordanian-Palestinian poet, translator
- Rula Jebreal (born 1973), journalist, novelist, screenwriter

== K ==
- Ghada Karmi (born 1939), doctor of medicine, non-fiction writer, columnist
- Sahar Khalifeh (born 1942), novelist, feminist
- Dima Khatib (born 1971), journalist

== M ==
- Jean Said Makdisi (born 1940), autobiographical writer
- Thurayyā Malḥas (1925–2013), poet and writer
- Amal Mansour (1950–2018), translator and writer

== R ==
- Rawda Al-Farkh Al-Hudhud (born 1946), Palestinian-Jordanian writer

== S ==
- Rosemarie Said Zahlan (1937–2006), Palestinian-American historian, essayist, non-fiction writer
- Serene Husseini Shahid (1920–2008), embroidery project leader, non-fiction writer
- Deema Shehabi (born 1970), Palestinian-American poet

== T ==
- Raymonda Tawil (born 1940), journalist, poet
- Fadwa Touqan (1917–2003), poet, autobiographer

== Z ==
- May Ziadeh (1886–1941), Lebanese-Palestinian poet, essayist, journalist, salonist, translator

== See also ==
- List of women writers
