= Najwa =

Najwa may refer to:

== People ==
=== Given name ===
- Najwa Barakat (born 1966), Lebanese novelist
- Najwa Binshatwan (born 1970), Libyan author
- Najwa Ghanem (born 1958), wife of Osama bin Laden
- Najwa Karam (born 1966), Lebanese actress and singer
- Najwa Kawar Farah (1923–2015), Palestinian educator
- Najwa Latif (born 1995), Malaysian singer
- Najwa Najjar, Palestinian filmmaker
- Najwa Nimri (born 1972), Spanish actress
- Najwa Qassem (1967–2020), Lebanese journalist

=== Surname ===
- Aina Najwa (born 1996), Malaysian cricketer

== Music ==
- Najwa (album), a 2017 studio album by jazz trumpeter Wadada Leo Smith

== See also ==
- Najwan
