= 2023 Gaza war ceasefire =

Truce between Israel and Hamas

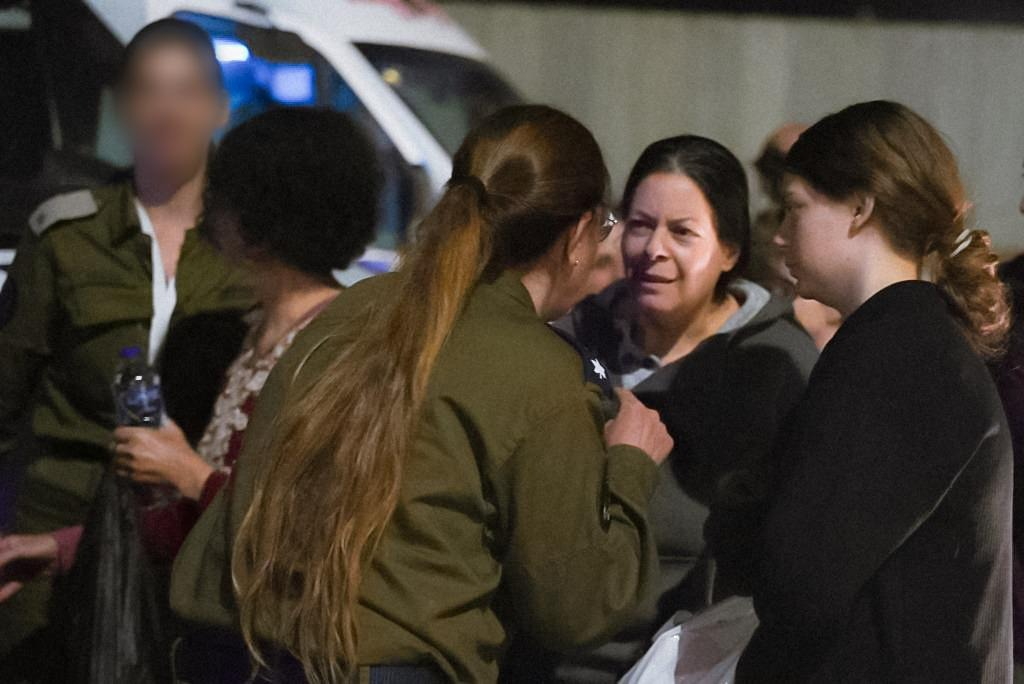
- Hostages released to the IDF on 25 November
- Type: Temporary ceasefire
- Context: Release of Israeli hostages and Palestinian prisoners
- Sealed: 22 November 2023
- Effective: 24 November 2023
- Expiration: 30 November 2023
- Mediators: Egypt; Qatar; United States
- Parties: Hamas; Israel

A temporary ceasefire between Israel and Hamas-led Palestinian militant groups in the Gaza Strip took effect from 24 November 2023 to 30 November 2023, during the Gaza war.

The initial agreement, mediated by Qatar, stipulated a four-day break in fighting during which 50 Israeli hostages held in Gaza and 150 Palestinian prisoners in Israel were to be released and more humanitarian aid will be allowed to enter Gaza, with the ceasefire subject to extension providing additional hostages are released. On 27 November, Qatari Ministry of Foreign Affairs announced a two-day extension to the ceasefire was agreed in which 20 Israelis and 60 Palestinians would be released. Close to the end of the first extension, on 30 November, another one day extension to the truce was agreed upon by both sides. The mediators in Qatar and in Egypt reported they worked to negotiate a further extension of the truce.

The deal was welcomed internationally, including by the United States, which also supported the deal's extensions. Both sides have blamed each other for violating the ceasefire. On 1 December, the truce ended with Hamas alleging that Israel rejected a hostage exchange deal to prolong the truce, and Hamas then launched rockets into Sderot. Israel responded with air raids on Gaza with the Gaza Health Ministry reporting 20 deaths. By 2 December negotiations had broken down, with the Israeli delegation leaving Qatar following an impasse and Hamas announcing they will not release any more hostages until the end of the war. The US blamed Hamas for violating the truce and the terms of the ceasefire.

== Background ==
On 7 October 2023, during Hamas-led attack on Israel that commenced the Gaza war, Palestinian militants captured or abducted around 250 people from Israel, including both soldiers and civilians, and took them back to the Gaza Strip. In addition to hostages with only Israeli citizenship, almost half of the hostages are foreign nationals or have multiple citizenships. By 23 November, four have been released by Hamas, two were found dead near the al-Shifa Hospital and one has been rescued.

Hamas have proposed an "everyone for everyone" deal, in which Palestinian militant groups would release all of the Israeli captives in return for the release of all Palestinian prisoners in Israel. 5,200 Palestinians were incarcerated by Israel before the war, but according to Palestinian officials, the number rose to over 10,000 amid a wave of mass detentions; following the deportation of several thousand detained Gazan workers, the Palestinian Commission for Detainees and Ex-Prisoners' Affairs placed the number at approximately 8,300.

Many of these prisoners are held under administrative detention, a process which is criticized by human right organizations as it only applied to West Bank Palestinians, and were arrested for crimes such as speech and nonviolent protest. Families of the hostages have urged the Israeli government to accept the deal, claiming it was supported by "all of Israel", but Defence Minister Yoav Gallant has dismissed the offer and insisted that Israel would free the hostages by force. Several countries and international organisations have called for temporary or permanent ceasefires since the start of the war. Several countries have been involved in negotiations between Israel and Hamas, with Qatar taking the lead.

An analysis by NBC News found that about 20% were convicted of a crime, while the roughly 80% of the list were not convicted of any crimes and had either not been prosecuted or had been detained under administrative detention. Among the Palestinians released on 30 November, was the prominent Palestinian activist Ahed Tamimi. An estimated 2,000 Palestinians are held in Israeli prisons without any charges against them, and those who are charged face a more than 99% conviction rate in Israeli military courts.

Israeli authorities, however, have labeled all the released prisoners as "terrorists"; they had been detained for "offenses related to Israel's security", from throwing stones to supporting terrorism and attempted murder. Of the 300 prisoners initially proposed for release, 124 were under 18, and another 146 are 18, with many of those having turned 18 in prison. Of the 240 prisoners released 107 were aged between 14 and 17; 104 boys, of whom 5 were 14, and 3 girls, all 16 and 17. The remaining 133 were adults; 65 men, all aged 18 except one who turned 19 in prison, and 68 women of various ages.

== Negotiations ==
The negotiations lasted for many months. They were greatly influenced by the new conditions created as a result of various Israeli operations in Gaza and the Middle East in general. During 2024, Israel killed multiple Hamas leaders and conducted several rescue operations. Several hostages, including American Hirsh Goldberg, were executed by Hamas. Hostages under Hamas suffered from malnourishment and ill treatment. Female hostages reported sexual assault in captivity.

The various sides were accused of sabotaging the negotiations: On one hand, the Netanyahu administration was accused by the press of sabotaging ceasefire talks. On the other hand, top U.S officials John Kirby and Antony Blinken accuse Hamas of hindering progress and constantly causing the failures to reach a hostages deal and ceasefire.

=== In opposition ===
On 24 October, US President Joe Biden stated, "We should have those hostages released and then we can talk", and subsequently doubled down on that opposition, saying that doing so would allow Hamas to attack Israel again. On 25 October, UK Prime Minister Rishi Sunak also rejected a call for a ceasefire. The UK's Leader of the Labour Party, Keir Starmer, also opposed a ceasefire on 8 November. German chancellor Olaf Scholz also opposed an "immediate cease-fire" on 13 November. However, by 13 December, Israel and the United States were becoming increasingly isolated amid growing global calls for a ceasefire.

The ceasefire was opposed domestically in Israel by three ministers from the political party Jewish Power.

=== In support ===
"Ceasefire now" demand at a rally in Toronto, Canada

On 27 October, the United Nations General Assembly voted for a resolution calling for an immediate truce. It received 121 votes in favor and 44 abstentions; 14 countries voted no: Israel, the US, Austria, Croatia, the Czech Republic, Fiji, Guatemala, Hungary, Marshall Islands, Micronesia, Nauru, Papua New Guinea, Paraguay and Tonga.

Numerous heads of state, government officials and institutions, and international bodies have called for a ceasefire. On 8 October, Moussa Faki Mahamat, the Chair of the African Union, called for an end to the conflict and the establishment of a Palestinian state. On 11 October, Brazilian President Luiz Inácio Lula da Silva called for a ceasefire, stating, it was "urgently needed in defense of Israeli and Palestinian children". On 15 October, Venezuelan President Nicolas Maduro called for an immediate ceasefire. On 16 October, Pakistani Prime Minister Anwar ul Haq Kakar called for an immediate ceasefire and the end of the Gaza blockade. On 18 October, Dáil Éireann passed a resolution calling for a ceasefire. On 19 October, Chinese President Xi Jinping stated, "The top priority now is a ceasefire as soon as possible", and called for the establishment of a Palestinian state.

On 20 October, Turkish President Recep Tayyip Erdoğan called for a ceasefire, stating Israel's attack on Gaza amounted to a genocide. On 21 October, Egyptian President Abdel Fattah al-Sisi presented a plan for a ceasefire. South African President Cyril Ramaphosa called for a ceasefire, stating "as South Africans we can relate to what is happening to Palestinians". Iraqi Prime Minister Mohammed Shia' Al Sudani called for ceasefire at the Cairo Peace Summit. On 24 October, Saudi Crown Prince Mohammed bin Salman called for a ceasefire. Malaysian Prime Minister Anwar Ibrahim called for a ceasefire and for Palestinians to be "treated as human beings". On 25 October, King Abdullah II of Jordan stated ending the war was an "absolute necessity". Humza Yousaf, the First Minister of Scotland, called for a ceasefire and stated that his own parents-in-law were trapped in Gaza. On 5 November, Mahmoud Abbas called for an immediate ceasefire. On 7 November, Mexican president Andrés Manuel López Obrador called for a ceasefire.

On 10 November, French president Emmanuel Macron urged Israel "to stop" bombing Gaza. During a press conference at the White House on 14 November, Indonesian president Joko Widodo called for a ceasefire "for the sake of humanity". On 15 November, Canadian Prime Minister Justin Trudeau urged Israel to exercise "maximum restraint". (Note: Trudeau notably did not call for a ceasefire, leading to condemnation from donors.) On 25 November, Belgian deputy prime minister Petra De Sutter called for a general ceasefire. On 9 December the prime ministers of Spain, Ireland, Belgium, and Malta signed a joint letter urging the European Union to call for a permanent ceasefire.

On 19 October, Cuban Foreign Affairs Minister Bruno Rodriguez Parrilla called for a ceasefire, stating the war was the result of the "violation of the inalienable rights of the Palestinian people". Jordanian Foreign Minister Ayman Safadi called for a ceasefire on 22 October. On 25 October, Algerian foreign minister Ahmed Attaf called for an immediate cessation of bombing. Retno Marsudi, Indonesia's Minister for Foreign Affairs, called for an immediate ceasefire. On 26 October, the Foreign Ministers of nine Arab countries — the United Arab Emirates, Jordan, Bahrain, Saudi Arabia, Oman, Qatar, Kuwait, Egypt and Morocco — signed a joint statement calling for an immediate ceasefire. On 8 November, UK Labour Party MP Imran Hussain resigned his frontbench position as shadow minister for the New Deal for Working People, to be able to advocate for a ceasefire outside of his frontbench position.

Various ambassadors and dignitaries also supported a ceasefire. On 18 October, Lana Zaki Nusseibeh, Ambassador of the United Arab Emirates, stated her country's support for "no less than a full humanitarian ceasefire". On 21 October and during a subsequent UN Security Council meeting on 24 October, UN Secretary-General António Guterres called for a ceasefire. Russian U.N. Ambassador Vassily Nebenzia stated, "the whole world" is expecting the UN to call for a ceasefire. On 29 October, Pope Francis called for a ceasefire and release of hostages. On 31 October, UN refugee commissioner Filippo Grandi called for a ceasefire.

On 5 November, the Inter-Agency Standing Committee issued a letter calling for an immediate humanitarian ceasefire, signed by the heads of 18 humanitarian organizations. On 10 November, 1,000 employees of USAID signed an open letter calling for an immediate ceasefire. On 21 November, the Scottish Parliament voted 90–28 in support of a motion calling for a ceasefire. On 26 November, EU Commissioner for Cohesion and Reforms, Elisa Ferreira, speaking on behalf of Josep Borrell, stated the European Union was calling for an immediate ceasefire. The European Parliament voted in favor of a ceasefire on 18 January. The Non-Aligned Movement announced its support for a ceasefire on 20 January 2024.

=== Israel and Hamas ===
On 2 November 2023, Hamas chairman Ismail Haniyeh stated that if Israel agreed to a ceasefire and the opening of humanitarian corridors to bring more aid into Gaza, Hamas is "ready for political negotiations for a two-state solution with Jerusalem as the capital of Palestine." (Note: East Jerusalem is considered Israeli-occupied Palestinian territory under international law.) This followed the 1 November statement by Hamas official Ghazi Hamad that Hamas would repeat the 7 October attack time and again until Israel is annihilated. On 3 November, Benjamin Netanyahu stated Israel would not agree to a ceasefire unless Hamas releases all hostages. On 6 November, both Israel and Hamas rejected calls for a ceasefire. On 15 November, Hamas official Izzat al-Risheq stated Israel was "stalling to continue its aggression and war against defenceless civilians."

In December, Israel proposed to stop fighting for a week in exchange for 40 hostages still held by Hamas. In response, Hamas declined this offer on 20 December, asserting that the release of Israeli hostages would not be considered until a ceasefire was put into place first. This was rejected by Israel the following day. In January 2024, CNN reported that Israel had proposed allowing senior Hamas leaders to leave Gaza as part of a ceasefire agreement.

== Agreement ==
On 22 November, an agreement was reached that was brokered by Qatar, Egypt and the U.S. after weeks of indirect negotiations. The deal provided for a four-day pause in fighting, the release of 50 Israeli hostages and 150 Palestinian prisoners, and the entry of more humanitarian aid into Gaza. The ceasefire agreement allowed up to 200 trucks of aid to enter Gaza daily. All Israelis and Palestinians freed were to be women and children. According to Hamas, the deal also involved Israel halting all air sorties over southern Gaza and maintaining a daily six-hour daytime no-fly window over northern Gaza.

Egyptian state media and a senior Israeli official announced that the ceasefire will enter into effect on the morning of 23 November. However, the ceasefire actually began a day later on 24 November. The Israeli government said that the ceasefire would be extended by one day for every additional 10 hostages released by Hamas, but insisted that fighting would resume once the truce is over.

During the ceasefire, Hamas declared that the Red Cross is not allowed to visit the remaining hostages in Gaza. This continued the prevention of Red Cross visits that started at the beginning of the hostage crisis, on 7 October 2023. But a term of the agreement was that Red Cross officials would be able to visit the hostages still held captive in Gaza by the end of the fourth day of the ceasefire.

The most important part of the ceasefire agreement concerned the exchange of hostages for prisoners. Extensions of the ceasefire are contingent on hostages being released in small batches every 24 hours. The negotiations were brokered by Qatar, Egypt, and the United States. In Israel the deal was called "Operation Heaven's Door" (Hebrew: דלתות שמיים), and the subprogram for the rehabilitation of foreign citizens was called "Operation "Friendly Hand" (Hebrew: יד אחות).

=== Hamas release of hostages ===
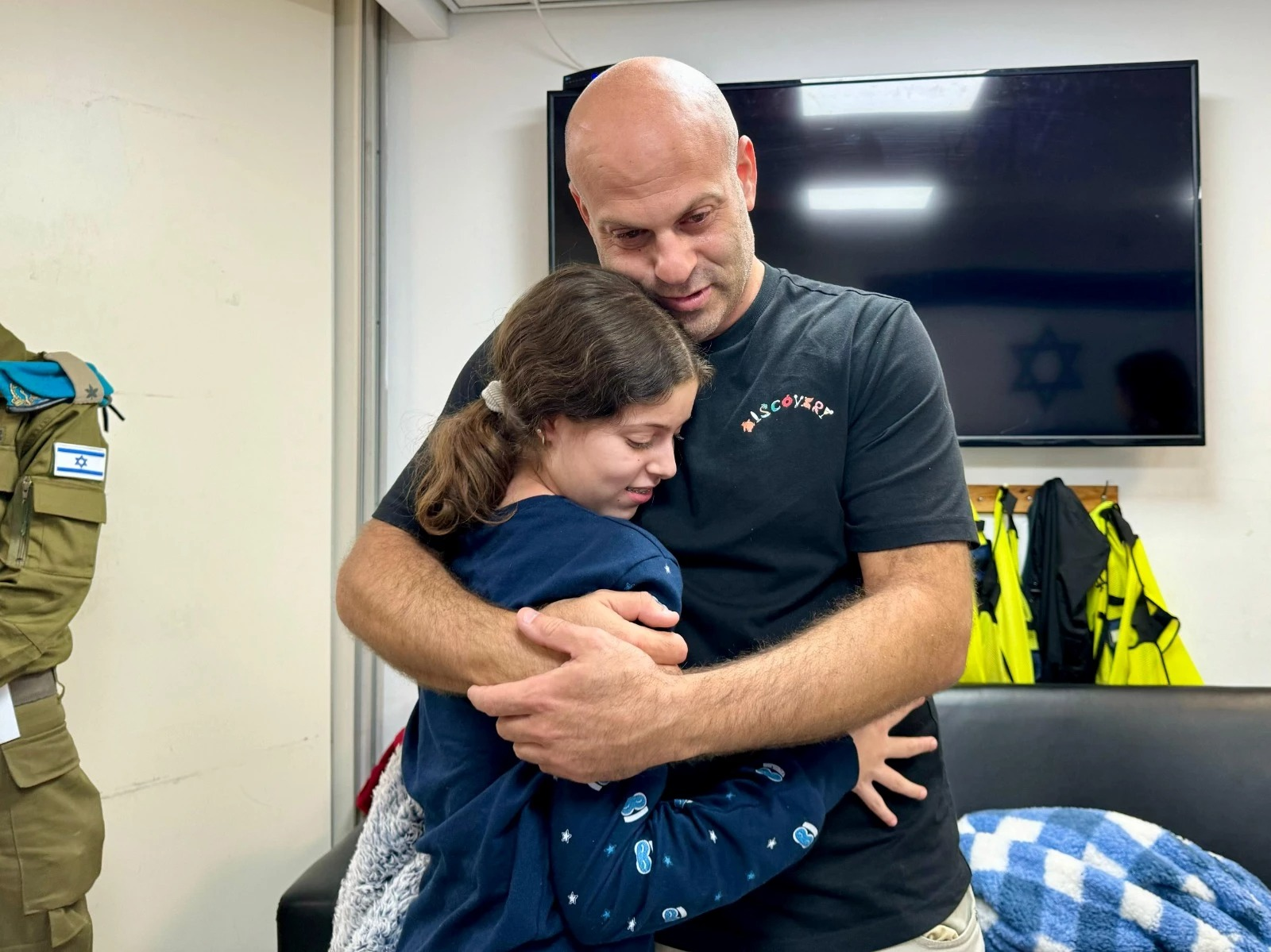
Hila Rotem, aged 13, embraced by her uncle, Yair Rotem, upon their reunion in the early hours of November 26, 2023, following her release.

On 24 November 2023, the Israeli government confirmed that 13 Israeli hostages were released. Srettha Thavisin, the Prime Minister of Thailand, confirmed on social media that 12 Thai hostages were released from Gaza. Later in the day it was reported that of the 24 hostages initially released on 24 November, the number included 13 Israeli citizens (of whom some were dual citizens), 10 Thai citizens and one Filipino citizen by the Qatar foreign ministry. Reportedly a number of Thai citizens were released outside of the truce agreement. As of 30 November 2023, 105 civilians had been released, which included 81 people from Israel, 23 Thais and one Filipino.

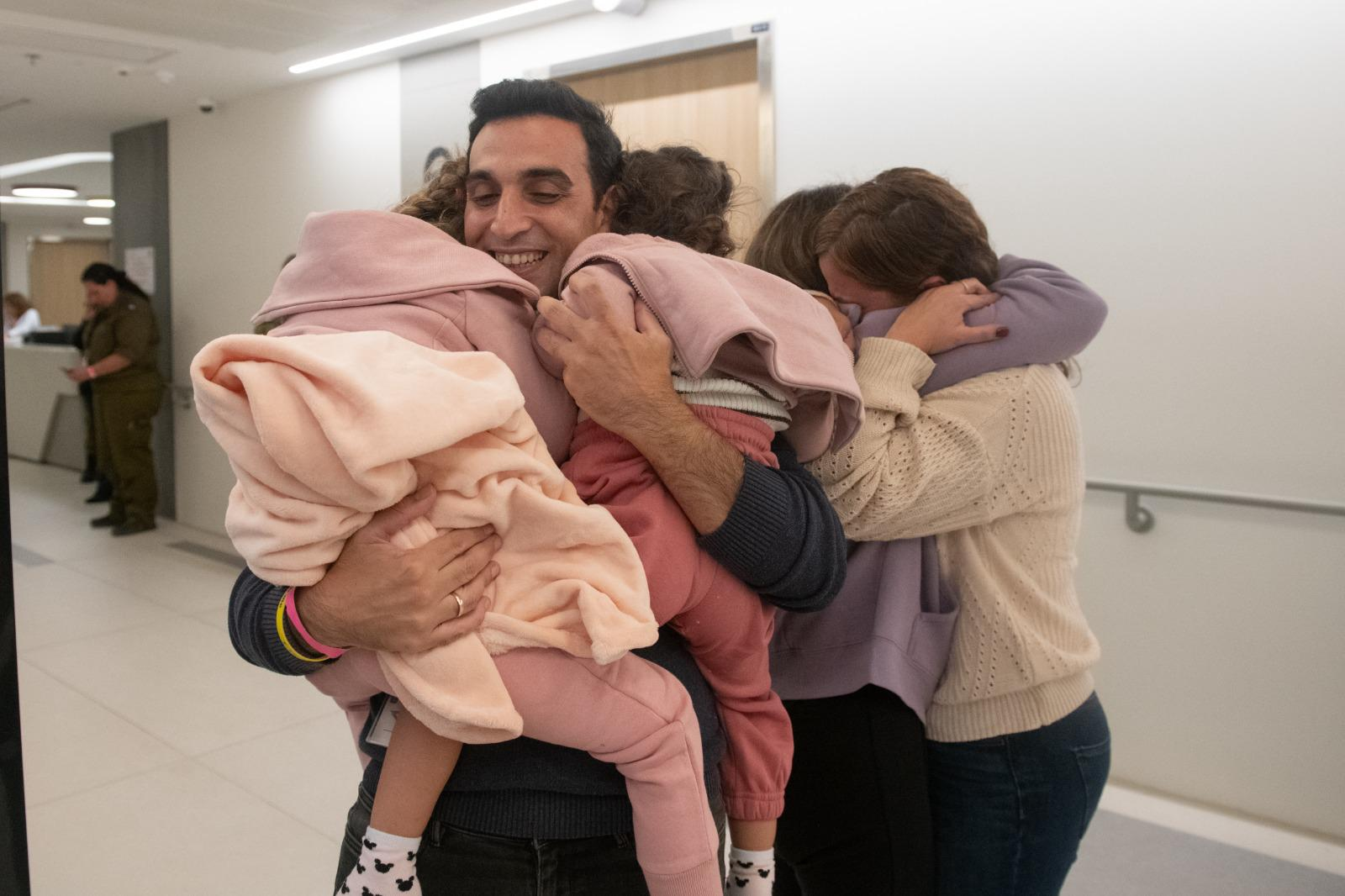
Yoni Asher met his two daughters, Raz (age 5) and Aviv (age 2½), who had been held as hostages.

The hostages were held in a variety of locations; some were held in Hamas' tunnel network, while others were held in civilian residences, commandeered from or reportedly offered by the local population. One of the hostages described arriving in a house that had been abandoned so quickly by its residents that the washing machine was still running, while another described being held in an attic by an UNRWA teacher and a third claimed they were held by a Gazan doctor. UNRWA responded, calling the report unsubstantiated and demanding that it be deleted. According to The Jerusalem Post, a Community Note on Twitter described the reported assembly of rockets in UNRWA schools and UNRWA teachers reportedly celebrating the massacres committed by Hamas on 7 October.

After being released, hostages were transported through the Rafah checkpoint to Egypt before being transported to Israel. They are then taken to the Hatzerim base for processing and vetting before being triaged and sent to about 5 different hospitals. Specialists from the Israeli Ministry of Social Welfare and psychologists, developed instructions on how soldiers should behave in different situations when communicating with returned child hostages. A responder should not touch them without the child's consent, and to not answer the questions "Where is my mother? When will I see dad?" but state things such as: "Baby, honey, I'm sorry, I don't know. My job is to bring you to Israel to a safe place where people you know will be waiting for you. They will answer all your questions." It was also suggested to use the child's name as much as possible when speaking to them. Dietary guidelines were also created for those released and regulations about not questioning released children and only allowing female doctors to care for them were issued.

=== Israeli release of prisoners ===
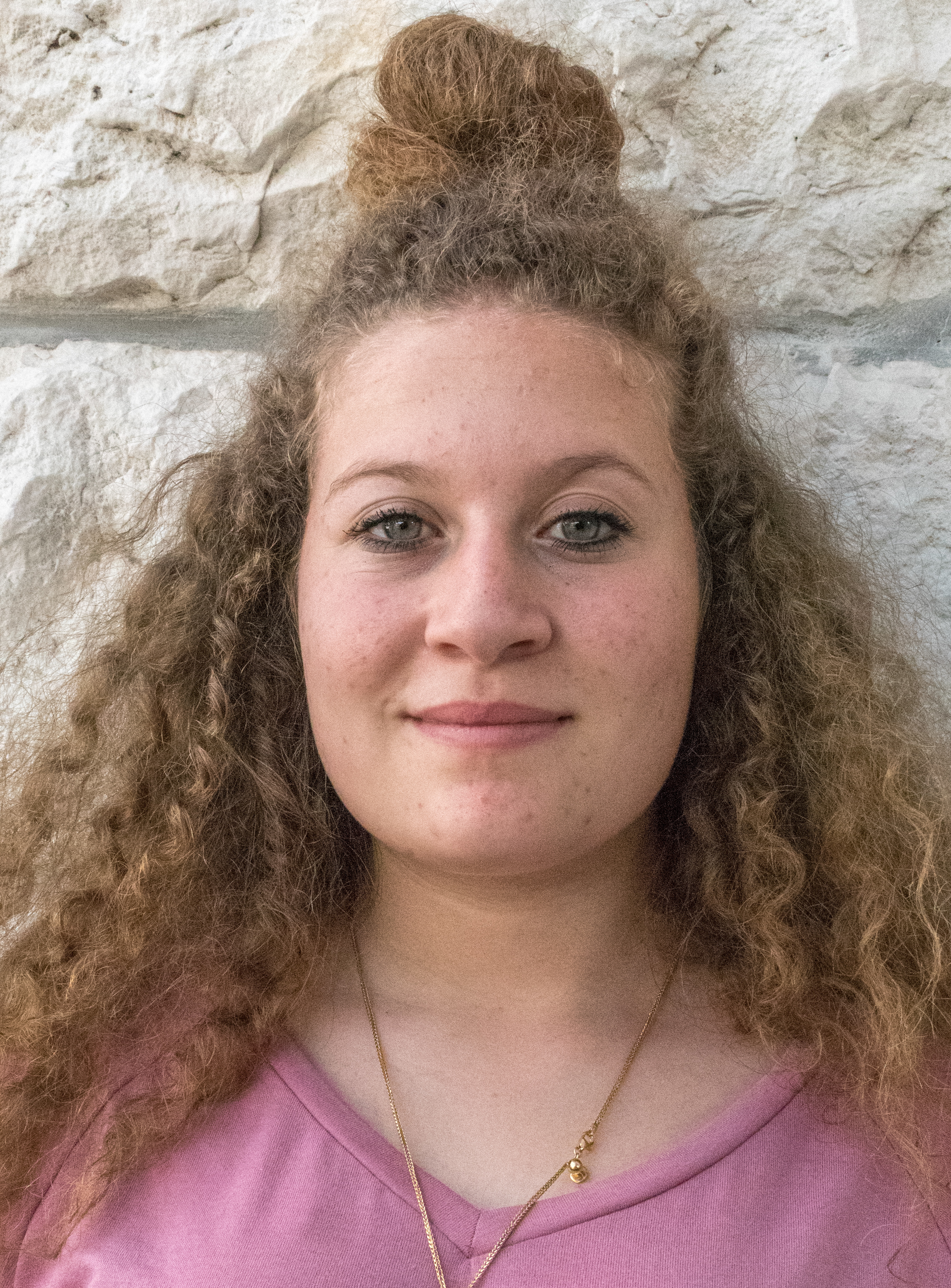
22-year old Palestinian woman Ahed Tamimi was released by Israel.

As part of the negotiated exchange, 150 Palestinian women and children were released from Israeli prisons over the course of days. By 28 November 2023, 180 prisoners had been released, chosen from a list of 300 held Palestinians. Notable prisoners released included Israa Jaabis and Ahed Tamimi. Israeli authorities fired tear gas at buses carrying the released prisoners. By the end of the temporary truce, Israel released 240 prisoners, of whom 107 were under 18 and three-quarters had not been convicted of a crime.

The Palestinian Prisoners Society stated more Palestinians had been arrested than released since the start of the ceasefire. Al Jazeera reported that for every Palestinian released, there is another Palestinian arrested. On 27 February 2024, a teenage boy released during the prisoner swap was rearrested by Israeli forces. On 21 March, another teenage boy released during the swap was re-arrested during a raid on his family home.

On 12 August 2024, 18 year old Tariq Daoud, who was released during the swap, carried out an attack, shooting and seriously wounding an Israeli man along with two Palestinians. He was shot dead by Israeli forces. On 15 August 2024, one of the prisoners released during the swap was killed in an Israeli drone strike, as he was attacking Israeli forces, during a counter-terrorism operation in the Balata refugee camp.

== Violations of ceasefire ==
On the first day of the ceasefire, the IDF opened fire on the hundreds of Palestinians trying to return to their homes in northern Gaza, killing 2 Palestinians and injuring 11. Many were returning home to retrieve their belongings. The IDF had warned Palestinians to not return by dropping leaflets. Some Palestinians decided to make the journey anyway due to lack of clothing and food.

Both sides have blamed each other for violating the ceasefire agreement, shortly after it began. About two weeks following the ceasefire's end, a senior Israeli officer said that Hamas broke the ceasefire 15 minutes after it began with a series of attacks by dozens of fighters against Israeli positions in the town of Salatin, near Jabaliya, which stopped after Israeli troops repulsed them and killed about 20 Hamas fighters. Israel accused Hamas of launching rockets into Israel about 15 minutes after the start of the pause, and claimed that it had not retaliated. The Gaza Health Ministry said that two people were killed and about thirty injured after Israeli soldiers had opened fire on Palestinians in the early morning. Sky News reported on 24 November that Israeli sniper fire injured members of a group of civilians trying to cross from the North to the South of Gaza on the first day of the ceasefire.

On 28 November, allegations of breaking the ceasefire were again raised by both sides. The IDF claimed that Hamas had detonated explosive devices near IDF troops, reportedly injuring several IDF soldiers with shots additionally fired upon them from Hamas militants. Hamas raised claims that the IDF's actions had raised friction in northern Gaza, with Israeli fighter jets flown over the Strip.

As of 29 November 2023, Hamas had not allowed Red Cross officials to visit hostages still being held in Gaza. This decision is a violation of the truce agreement between Israel and Hamas that stipulated Red Cross officials would be able to visit the hostages still held captive in Gaza by the end of the fourth day of the ceasefire. An Israeli sniper shot and injured men in Gaza. The United Nations reported that two Palestinians in Gaza were killed by Israeli fire. On 30 November Hamas claimed responsibility to shooting Israelis at a bus stop in Jerusalem.

On 24 January 2024, Israel re-arrested a teenager who had been released as part of the swap, which sparked outrage amongst Palestinian groups, including the Palestinian Prisoners' Society which called the boy's re-arrest a "blatant violation" of the terms of the swap agreement. According to Israel the seventeen year old had engaged in "terrorist activities" after his release.

== Prison and hostage conditions ==
=== Hamas's hostage conditions ===
The initial 24 hostages released by Hamas were all reported to be in "good condition"; later, it was reported that most were in good physical shape, but some had been ordered to remain in hospital. Female hostages testified that they were sexually assaulted and tortured by Hamas members who captured them. According to the Hostages and Missing Families Forum, female hostages were held in cages.

Few of the released hostages have spoken of their experiences, but those who have recounted being kept in crowded spaces with little electricity and without mattresses. The hostages were fed in very sparse portions, with some being given a single piece of bread per day, or small amounts of chicken, rice, bread, canned hummus, cheese and tea. Some child hostages were reportedly forced to watch footage of the 7 October Hamas attacks. A 78-year-old released hostage told Channel 13, "We were OK."

An 85-year-old woman stated to Time Magazine, "captives were treated well and received medical care, including medication. The guards kept conditions clean." The aunt of a released 12-year old hostage said that the child was beaten by Hamas fighters, adding that crying children were threatened with guns to be silent. According to a freed Thai hostage, the Israeli hostages held with him were abused by their captors, being beaten including with electrical cables. He added that they were all underfed, generally being given one pita a day, and were only allowed to shower once during the almost two months they were held; according to the Israeli Health Ministry, some of the released elderly women had lost between 8 and 15 kilograms (18 and 33 lb) during their time in captivity.

The uncle of two child-hostages described them being "branded" with the exhaust pipe of a motorbike, in order to make it easier to recapture them should they escape, as well as being drugged. One of the hostages, Elma Avraham, went without her medication for 50 days; upon her release she was transferred to hospital "in a serious and life-threatening condition", with a pulse of 40 and a body temperature of 28 °C (82 °F); according to her daughter she was hours from death at the time she was released. During a reportedly contentious meeting with Prime Minister Benjamin Netanyahu, one released hostage stated the hostages were "terrified that it would not be Hamas, but Israel, that would kill us."

=== Israeli prison conditions ===
The prisoners released by Israel described mistreatment and a lack of clean water and food in Israeli prisons. Few of the released hostages have spoken of their experiences, but those who have recounted being kept in crowded spaces with little electricity, no mattresses, and sparse food available, with varying amounts distributed among the hostages; the family of one released hostage additionally claimed he had been forced to watch "horror videos" of the initial attacks.

One released prisoner stated "We've been tortured." They stated that conditions in Israeli prisons had worsened for Palestinians since the start of the conflict on 7 October, with prison suppression units beating prisoners daily. A 17-year-old boy told child inmates' blankets and pillows, spare clothes, and window coverings had been removed. A released female prisoner stated Israel had deprived inmates of food, medicine, and sleep. Another said Israeli cells did not protect prisoners from the rain, adding she lost 14 kilos during her detention. One teenager described a prison doctor laughing when the boy asked for medicine for an arm injury. Another teenage boy described being stripped naked and kicked by a prison officer wearing steel-toe boots. Other released teenage prisoners reported being tear-gassed, beaten, pepper-sprayed and threatened with guns. Some, including the Palestinian writer and journalist Lama Khater, reported being threatened with rape and attacked by muzzled dogs. Prisoners report being denied bathing and forced to wear a single item of clothing for weeks on end, and skin diseases have accordingly spread as a result of the poor sanitary conditions.

Amnesty International described "torture and other ill-treatment" in Israeli prisons since 7 October, and at least six inmates were killed. An attorney at Addameer stated that since the 7 October attack, prisoners had been denied medical care, food and water, family visits, and lawyer visits. The mother of one released Palestinian teenager called on the Red Cross to investigate Israeli prison conditions. Testimony collected from released women by B'Tselem found they had faced extreme violence and even the threat of rape.

Several of the Palestinians released during the 2025 prisoner exchange bore signs of torture and starvation, according to the Palestinian Prisoner's Society, and some, upon arrival to their destination, had to be immediately transported to medical facilities for treatment due to their poor conditions. The mistreatment of Palestinians at the hands of Israeli forces included "starvation crimes, systematic medical crimes, and the infection of a number of them with scabies, in addition to the severe beatings that the prisoners were subjected to before their release," said the society, which adds that Israeli abuse escalated after October 7, 2023, and that some prisoners suffered fractured ribs.

Some of the released Palestinians said that the abuse worsened after the January 2025 ceasefire agreement was announced, and that they continued to be subjected to beatings and other forms of violence up to the last minute before their release. Othman Abu Khurj reported being beaten alongside other released Palestinians by Israeli soldiers in the presence of the Red Cross. Others were tear-gassed as they were about to be released from their cells. An 18-year-old said that during his last week in detention, he was not allowed to shower. His body was covered in scabies, and Israeli officials refused to have them treated. Another 18-year-old said that Israeli guards "tortured us in the cell, every day. They also tortured and mistreated the women." Released prisoners were reportedly transported out with their hands over their heads with a band saying: "The people of eternity does not forget."

==== Restrictions on speech and movement ====
The released Palestinian captives were warned by Israel in a statement from Israel's national security minister Itamar Ben Gvir, not to celebrate their release or they would be returned to prison. The released prisoners were also barred from political activity, posting political content on social media, or going to any protests. One released teenager was told by Israeli officials that he was "not allowed to leave my house, raise any signs or banners" and that if any of the rules were broken he could be re-arrested and leading up to his release his families home had been searched several times. Israeli police fired tear gas on the families of prisoners and their supporters waiting outside Ofer Prison. East Jerusalem residents reported a "crackdown" prior to the prisoners' release. Israeli raids in Beitunia were reportedly conducted ahead of prisoner releases to prevent celebrations from taking place.

== Reactions ==
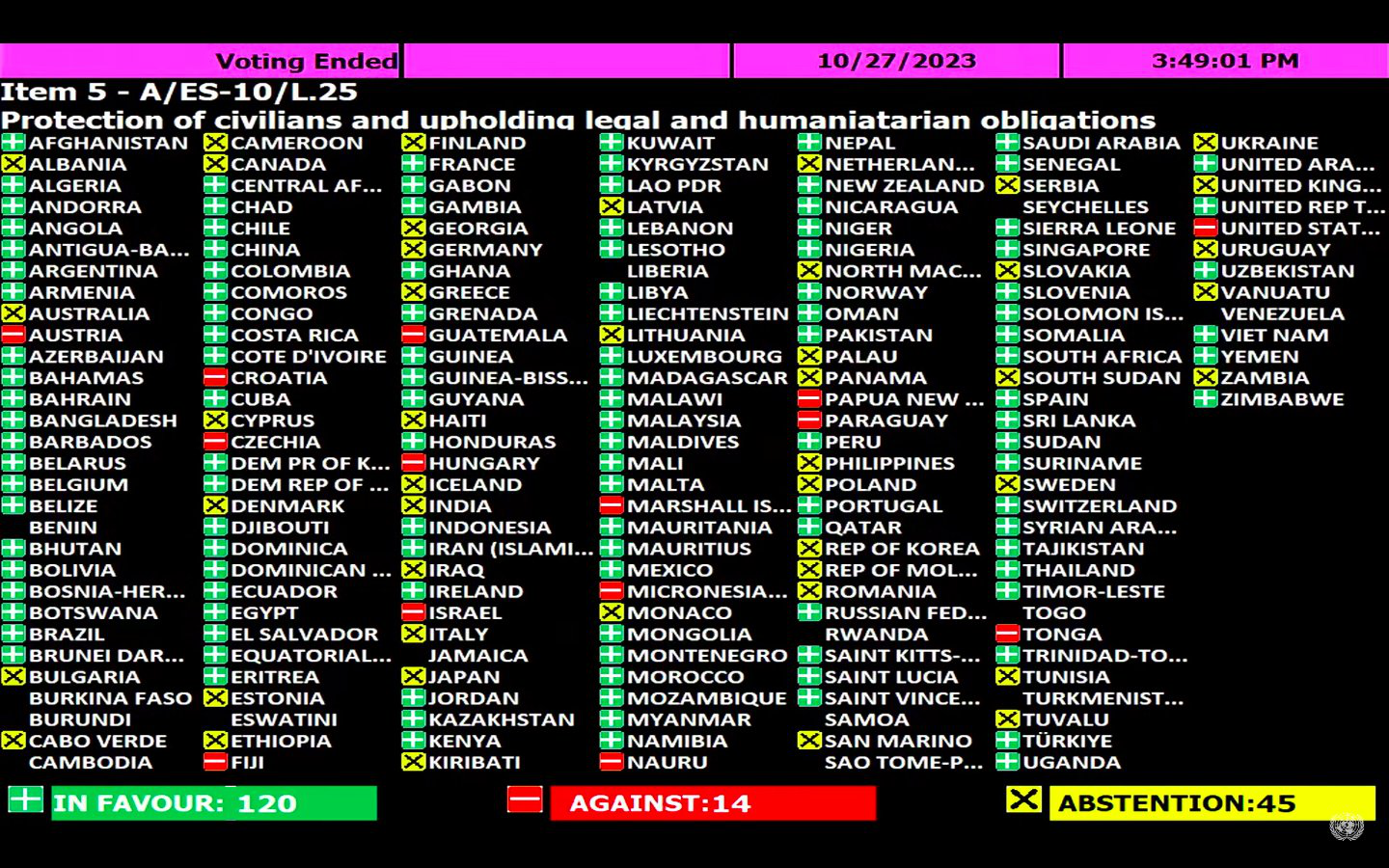
On 27 October, the United Nations General Assembly passed Resolution ES-10/21 calling for an "immediate and sustained" humanitarian truce and cessation of hostilities.

The Israeli Prime Minister's Office released a statement on the release of the first group of hostages on 24 November, stating that the government "embraces our citizens returning home" and that they were "committed to the return of all hostages and missing persons." Israel President Isaac Herzog, also commented on the release along with Opposition Leader Yair Lapid, and Defense Minister Yoav Gallant, who all welcomed back the hostages and indicated their work would not be complete until every hostage had been released.

A physician who has been working with those released from being hostages remarked on the resilience of many of those released, but cautioned the long process of restoring those released sense of trust and control while living in Israel.

=== From families of hostages ===
Gil Dickman, the cousin of hostage Carme Gat, told The Independent that "if this deal opens the door to the next deal," then more hostages will be released, adding "the problem is whether it's going to fall apart in between the days." Another hostages parent lamented over her jealousy that the families of those released hostages were able to hug and see their released loved ones.

Many family members also referenced those still held captive, with a brother of one of the return children stating while they were happy, there were still other hostages and they needed to keep up the struggle until everyone was returned. Another who had a relative returned but another is still held captive, stated that they were still missing parts of their heart. Relatives of an American-Israeli girl who was orphaned in the 7 October attacks celebrated her release stating, "there are no words to express our relief and gratitude" on her homecoming.

=== Palestinians ===
Palestinian residents had mixed reactions. Some told The New York Times that it was "a little bit of relief" while many feared it would not end the war. One view was that four days was not enough time to pull bodies from the rubble or search for missing people. In the West Bank, thousands reportedly gathered around the Israeli military's Ofer Prison awaiting the release of the Palestinian prisoners, while waving Palestinian flags. Israeli police reportedly fired tear gas into the crowd in an effort to disperse it. Israel's National Security Minister Itamar Ben-Gvir said that Palestinians were banned from celebrating their release, because "Expressions of joy are equivalent to backing terrorism, victory celebrations give backing to those human scum, for those Nazis." In the Qalandiya refugee camp in the West Bank, a Palestinian stated that while the cease fire is a good pause from the bombardment it is not a solution, calling the Israeli military actions a massacre. Some feared the return of airstrikes "at any minute."

Bisan Owda, who had been documenting the conflict on social media, criticized the ceasefire as not guaranteeing the end of Israel's military operations in Gaza, "not enough to pull the dead bodies from under the rubble and bury them," and freelance journalist Hind Khoudary said the ceasefire was "meaningless" without being able to return to Gaza.

=== International ===
The deal was welcomed by U.S. President Joe Biden and by the United Kingdom, France, China, and Russia. The prime minister of Qatar, Sheikh Mohammed bin Abdulrahman Al Thani expressed hope that the ceasefire would become permanent and the deal was applauded by Arab foreign ministers, who called for significant increase in aid to Gaza and an extended truce. Politico reported that some in the Biden administration was concerned that a ceasefire would give journalists greater access to Gaza and allow them to report on destruction there, turning public opinion against Israel. During the ceasefire, U.S. secretary of state Antony Blinken said that any future military operation by Israel should include plans to minimize further casualties of Palestinian civilians.

On 22 November, South African President Cyril Ramaphosa welcomed the four-day ceasefire and expressed hope that it would bolster efforts to achieve an "outright end to the current conflict." Joel Weiller, the Director General of Médecins du Monde, stated, "A four-day pause is a band-aid not healthcare. This is not humanitarian access, it's a joke." On 30 November, Spanish Prime Minister Pedro Sanchez stated that continuing the military actions in Gaza after the truce ends is not acceptable, and that he doubts Israel respects the international humanitarian law. On the same day, 30 November, Jordan's king - Abdullah, urged U.N. aid officials and international groups to pile pressure on Israel to allow more humanitarian aid into Gaza.

On 22 December, Scottish Prime Minister Humza Yousaf stated, "When history books tell the story of the devastation of Gaza, future generations will rightly condemn those who opposed an immediate ceasefire."

White House National Security Council spokesman John Kirby has attributed the end of the temporary cease-fire agreement with Israel to Hamas. Kirby stated on "Fox News Sunday" that the U.S. believes eight or nine Americans are still held hostage by Hamas in Gaza. Kirby stated: "Hamas is the reason that the pause ended, because they refused to put on the list additional women and children that we know that they are holding and they're refusing to let go," Kirby said. "We are working literally by the hour to see if we can get this back on track." Kirby further stated that the US is working to reinstate the cease-fire. Despite recognizing the humanitarian crisis in Gaza, Kirby underscored the need to help Israel eliminate the threat from Hamas.

On December 2, Netanyahu ordered the return of the delegation from Doha, as negotiations reportedly had stalled due to Hamas's refusal to implement agreements that provided for the release of all children and women from a list of hostages. The same day, after the truce had already ended, Turkey's president Recep Tayyip Erdoğan stated that the opportunity for a permanent ceasefire was lost due to what he refers to as "Israel's uncompromising approach".

== See also ==
- January 2025 Gaza war ceasefire
- Calls for a ceasefire during the Gaza war
- Diplomatic impact of the Gaza war
- Gaza peace plan
- Gaza war hostage crisis
- List of Arab–Israeli prisoner exchanges
- Timeline of the Gaza war (27 November 2024 – 18 January 2025)
