= Lama Khater =

Palestinian journalist and writer (born 1976)

- لمى خاطر
- Born: 18 April 1976 (age 50); Palestine
- Occupations: Writer, political analyst
- Writing career
- Subjects: Arts, Politics

Lama Khater (Arabic: لمى خاطر, born 18 April 1976) is a Palestinian journalist and writer who comments on human rights and the Middle East. She has written for many newspapers and websites such as Felestin. Khater is a vociferous critic of Israel and the Palestinian Authority's political stances.

== Arrest and detainment ==
Ramallah Authority's intelligence service arrested her husband, Hazem Al-Fakhouri, many times trying to stop her writing. On 24 July 2018, Lama Khater was detained in Hebron by the Israeli army and taken to Ashkelon Prison. On 1 August her lawyer reported she was being questioned for 10 hours a day. Other reports state that her interrogations involved her being strapped to a chair for 20 hours at a time. On 23 August her detention order was extended 7 days for further interrogation. She was accused of incitement and belonging to a prohibited organisation. She was held for up to a year due to her reporting, described as "inflammatory" by Israeli authorities.

Khater was again detained on October 26, 2023, after the IDF stormed her home in the middle of the night. Her lawyer informed the Committee to Protect Journalists that she had been strip searched and threatened with sexual violence, harm to her children, and deportation to Gaza. Following her release in the 2023 exchange of Israeli hostages for Palestinian prisoners, Khater described explicit threats of rape by Israeli guards and use of tear gas in dormitories at Damon prison.

== Personal life ==
Khater has five children.

== See also ==
- List of Palestinian women writers
