= Nejmeh Khalil Habib =

Palestinian writer

- Born: 1946 (age 79–80); Haifa, British Mandate Palestine
- Education: Lebanese University
- Occupations: Writer and novelist
- Years active: 1999-present

Nejmeh Khalil Habib (Arabic: نجمة خليل حبيب) is a Palestinian writer. She obtained a doctorate in philosophy from the University of Sydney in Australia. She was awarded a scholarship from the Australia Council for the Arts, as well as The Gibran Khalil Gibran International Prize issued by the Association for the Revival of Arab Heritage in Australia. In addition, she received a certificate of appreciation from the General Federation of Palestine Workers, Australia Branch.

Habib has published books and novels, most notable is the book titled Visions of exile and return in the Arabic Palestinian novel in 2014. She published the book From Australia: Contemporary Literary Faces in 2006. In 2003, she published her novel A Spring that Did Not Blossom. The novel And the Children Suffer, was published in 2001, in addition to her first famous work, a book titled Humanitarian Patterns in the Literature of Ghassan Kanafani, which was published in 1999.

== Early childhood and education ==
Habib was born in 1946 in the city of Haifa, Mandatory Palestine. Both of her parents were from the village of Kafr Bir'im, Safad District. However, she was raised in suburbs of the Lebanese capital, Beirut, and studied in its schools and universities. At a young age, she started writing for a number of Lebanese newspapers, such as Al-Nasiriya, Al-Adab, al-Hawadith, and Al-Muharrar, as well as My Political Vision magazine.

Habib lived through the Lebanese war. She then launched her literary project when she traveled to Australia, where she became involved in the Arab cultural scene. She worked as the editor-in-chief of the cultural quarter 'Jusoor', and contributed to most of the Arab newspapers published in Australia. She obtained a Bachelor of Arts from the Beirut Arab University in 1970, as well as a master's degree in literature from the Lebanese University in Beirut in 1991. She traveled to Australia, where she has resided with her family since 1991.

== Career ==
Habib has written critical studies and research that have been published in cultural magazines and periodicals in different parts of the world, such as: Al Carmel (Palestine), Joussour: Australian Quarterly Literary Magazine (Australia), Tabayyun (Qatar), An-Najah University Journal for Scientific Research (Nablus), Al-Kalima magazine. In addition to numerous articles and stories in local newspapers and websites, Habib also has some contributions in English that have been published in: Joussour, Nebula and AlMashreq.

She contributed to the fields of story, criticism, and research in Arab newspapers in Australia and other emigrants. She then worked as editor-in-chief of Jusoor magazine, and as bureau manager for the Arabic newspaper Al-Hayat in Sydney. She moved to take the position of teacher of Arabic language and literature at the University of Sydney. She was awarded a scholarship by the Supreme Council of the Arts in New South Wales for the year 2003 for a work entitled From Australia: Contemporary Literary Faces.

Habib focuses in her literary and academic project on the values of truth, goodness, justice and freedom, such as the issue of Palestine, women and a crushed childhood in a world of wars and deprivation. Habib wrote a number of stories in this context, perhaps the most prominent of which are: A Spring that Did Not Blossom, motherhood made us ashamed, and for women on International Women's Day. She also touched on these topics in many articles, such as: An angry cry on International Women's Day, ambitious security for women on International Women's Day, and others.

Habib published her first and most famous book in 1999 under the title The Humanitarian Patterns in the Literature of Ghassan Kanafani through Bisan Publishing and Distribution. In it, Habib reflected the prevailing view that researchers and scholars of Kanafani literature considered a political literature that gained its value from the importance of the issue it represents. However, Habib studied this literature and treated it from a humanitarian perspective, in which she researched the Palestinian issue. Her second work was the novel titled And the Children Suffer, also published by Bisan Publishing and Distribution in November 2001. The book tells the story of a woman who was on her way to a public café in the city. She then notices how boring and monotonous her life is, and decides in a moment to turn back time and escape her boredom. She lives her life as he thought she should have during her teenage days.

A Spring that Did Not Blossom is Habib's third work and was published by the Arab Center for Research and Documentation in October 2003. In it, Habib sides with simple people. She tells the story of Maryam, the mother who was fascinated by her loneliness, and Naaman the martyr who was ashamed of his thoughts that distorted his heroism. It also tells the story of Hanan, who was confused between glorifying and condemning her father's heroism. Lastly, she wrote about Amer who was torn between his family duty and his national ambitions. Habib's most successful work was the book From Australia: Contemporary Literary Faces, which was published by the Arab House for Science Publishers in 2006. Habib moved from studying Ghassan Kanafani's literature to studying world literature, specifically Australian literature, where she presented the most prominent contemporary literary faces in the continent of Australia, where she has lived for some time.

In 2014, Habib published Visions of Exile and Return in the Arab Palestinian Novel in the section of the Israeli–Palestinian conflict and the liberation of Jerusalem and Palestine, published by the Arab Institute for Studies and Publishing. In this book, Habib presented a study examining the visions of exile and return in the Palestinian Arab novel, which took its models from different diasporic environments and multiple intellectual affiliations. It was made clear to her that the Palestinians, regardless of their ideological, cultural and social sects - whether they are in the diaspora, internally or under occupation - all consider their situation temporary. She affirmed in this book - which was considered by some critics as a coherent study - a firm belief in the right of all Palestinians to recover the houses, the fields, the villages and the cities that were stolen from them in both occupations. Habib sectioned this book - or study - into six chapters which looked at the different visions of the two themes of exile and return. In the first chapter, she discussed what she called the inflammatory vision of resistance in the literature of Ghassan Kanafani. In the second chapter she talked about the apostolic future vision in the literature of Jabra Ibrahim Jabra. The third chapter deals with a vision that questions identity. The fourth chapter talks about a revolutionary societal vision. The fifth chapter talks about an institutional vision for Yahya Khalaf, and the sixth chapter targets the combative experience feature.

Habib collaborated with the Arab House of Science Publishers again to publish her book entitled Critical Readings in Poetry and Novel which was published in 2017. In it, she presented the outcome of a long experience in the critical field based on comparison, balancing, discussion and correction. The book included a set of visions and studies in the fields of the Arabic literary text. She also reviewed selections from works of poetry and narrative texts. In this book, Habib focused on critical reading of poems, novels, stories and biographies, as well as thought and society. Her book was published by the same publishing house under the title My grandmother lost the dream and other stories in 2018. In this book, She gave the main role to the 'grandmother', where she focused on the subject of dreams, and talked about what she described as random memories. She recalled the time of the Palestinian rise in literature with Mahmoud Darwish and the time of the revolution with Abu Ammar and others. Habib wrote about the time of regression, as she called it, denoting the clashes between Fatah and Hamas, the massacre in Beit Hanoun, the invasion of Beirut, the militia war, and others. In the third section of the book, Habib narrates about the writer's concerns, writing, the author's journalistic experience, as well as memories with old friends. The fourth and final section of the group is titled Emotional. In it, Habib follows the style of narrative poetry. The heroine in each poem becomes the narrator and is the poem's main structural device.

== List of works ==
- Visions of Exile and Return in the Palestinian Arab Novel (2014)
- From Australia: Contemporary Literary Faces (2006)
- A Spring that Did Not Blossom (2003)
- And the Children Suffer (2001)
- Humanitarian Patterns in the Literature of Ghassan Kanafani (1999)
