= Michel Warschawski =

Israeli journalist and anti-Zionist activist

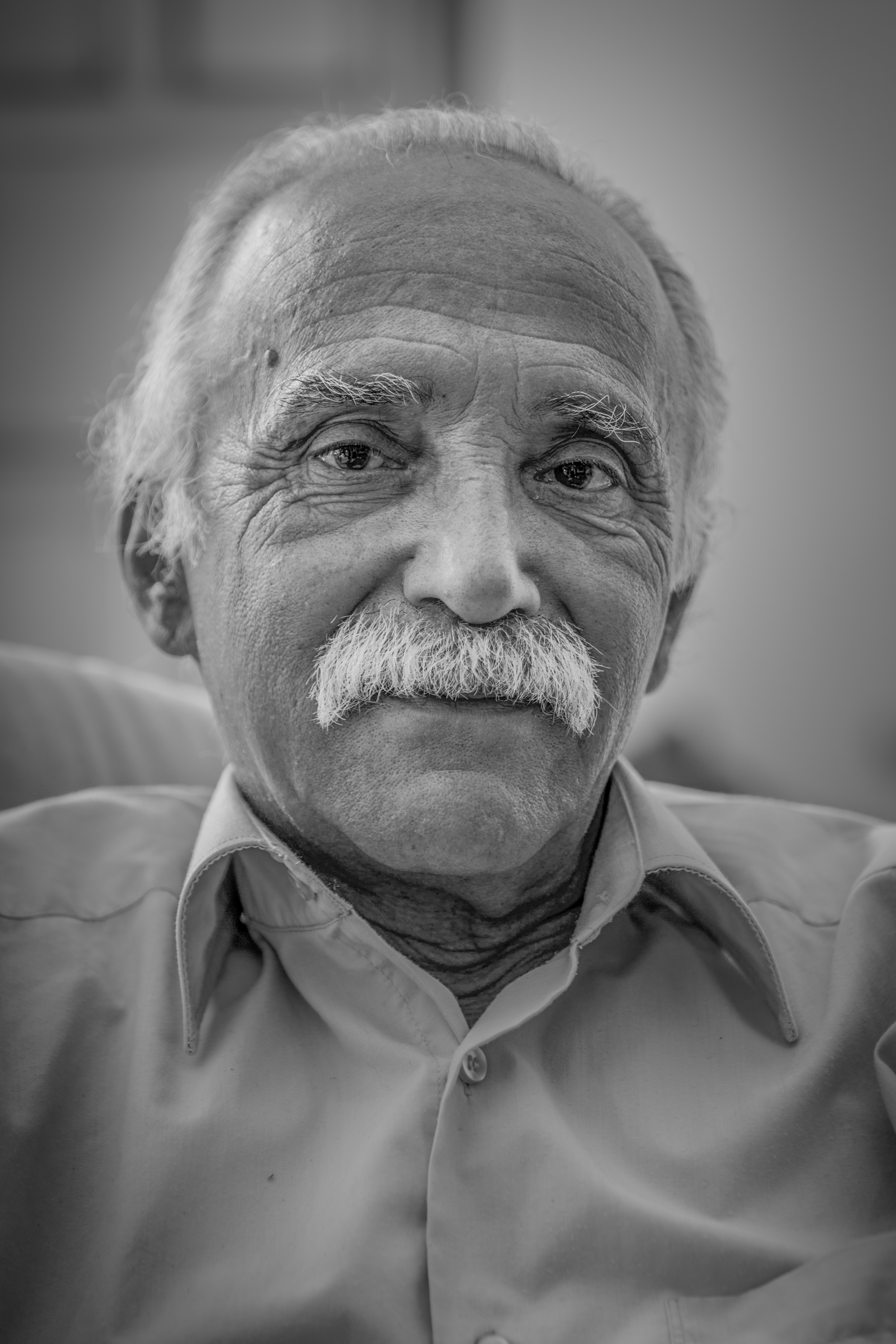
Michel Warschawski, July 2014.

Michel Warschawski (Mikado) (Hebrew: מיכאל ורשבסקי (מיקאדו); born 25 July 1949) is an Israeli anti-Zionist activist. He led the Marxist Revolutionary Communist League (previously Matzpen-Jerusalem) until its demise in the 1990s, and founded the Alternative Information Center, a joint Palestinian-Israeli non-governmental organization, in 1984.

== Biography ==
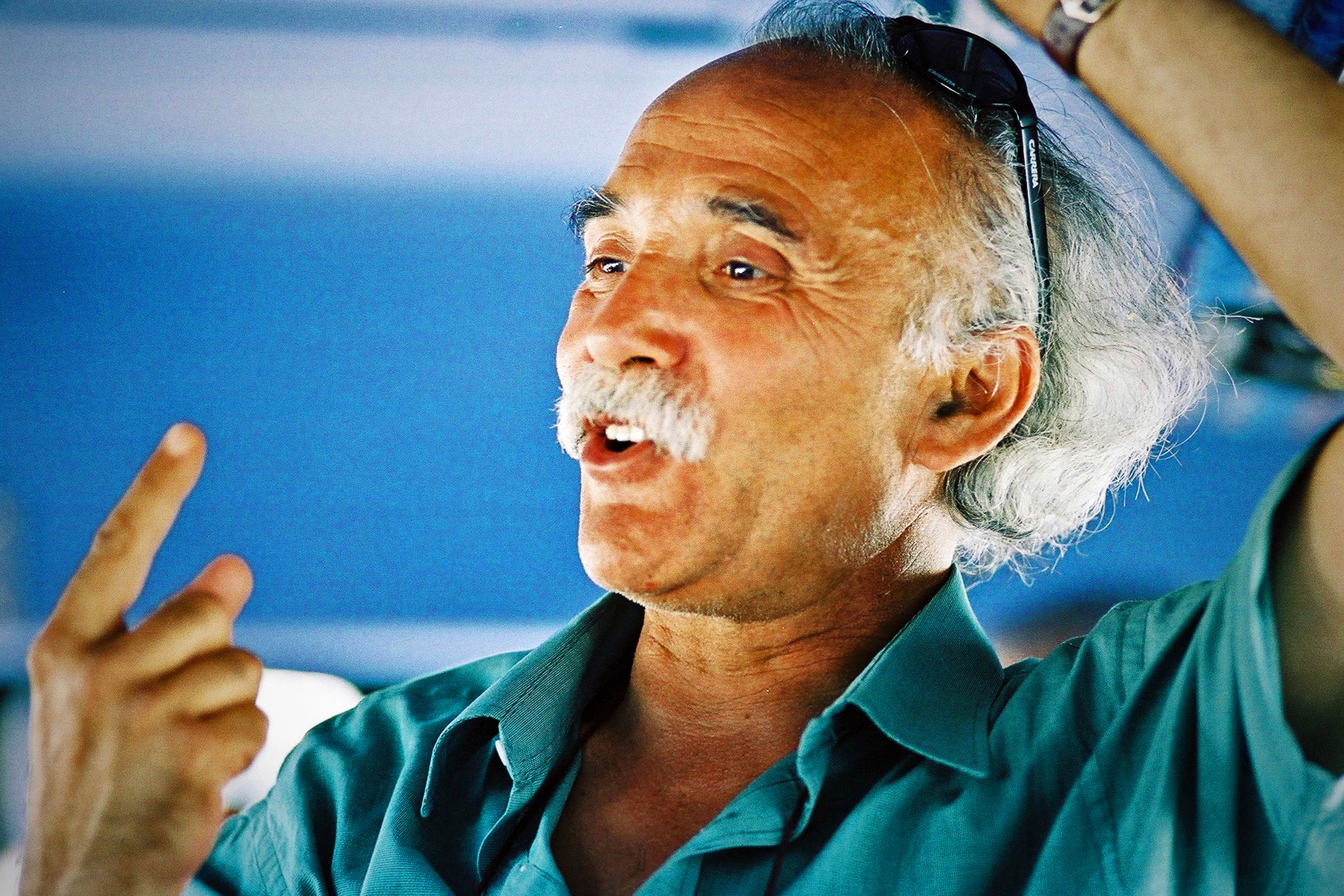
Michel Warschawski, July 2005.

Michel Warschawski was born 1949 in Strasbourg, France, where his father was the Rabbi. At the age of 16 Warschawski moved to Jerusalem, in order to study the Talmud. He is a graduate of Mercaz HaRav. He later studied philosophy at the Hebrew University of Jerusalem. Despite having long since stopped being religious, fellow activists on occasion turned to him to elucidate subtle points of Judaism.

In 1982, Warschawski was one of the co-founders of Yesh Gvul, a term that plays on three meanings: (1) "there is a border": "there is a limit": and "enough's enough". In 1984, Warschawski established the Alternative Information Center (AIC), an organization uniting Israeli and Palestinian anti-Zionist activists.

In 1987, Warschawski was arrested for "providing services for illegal (Palestinian) organizations" and sentenced in 1989 to twenty months in prison, with a 10-month suspended sentence, for typesetting a booklet that the judges ruled had come from members of the Popular Front for the Liberation of Palestine, which described torture and interrogation techniques allegedly employed by Israel's security apparatus, with advice on how to withstand them. The court determined that Warschawski was unaware of the booklet's origins, but guilty of closing his eyes to the evidence.

Warschawski is a writer and journalist, whose articles appear regularly in International Viewpoint, Le Monde diplomatique, ZNet, Monthly Review, Siné Hebdo and other publications. He has also been interviewed for the Real News Network. In the 2006 elections to the Knesset, he was a candidate on the list of an Arab Israeli party ballot (the National Democratic Assembly). He was a candidate for the Joint List in the 2015 election.

Warschawski is married to human rights attorney Lea Tsemel, and is the father of two sons and a daughter. His 1987 trial for supporting a terrorist organization is included in the documentary film Advocate (2019), about the legal career of his wife, Lea.

== Bibliography ==
- Toward an Open Tomb: The Crisis of Israeli Society (New York, 2004) ISBN 978-1-58367-109-2
- On the Border (London, 2005) ISBN 978-0-7453-2325-1
- The 33 Day War: Israel's War on Hezbollah in Lebanon and Its Consequences (with Gilbert Achcar) (London, 2007) ISBN 978-0-86356-646-2
