= Leah Tsemel =

Israeli human rights lawyer (born 1945)

- לאה צמל
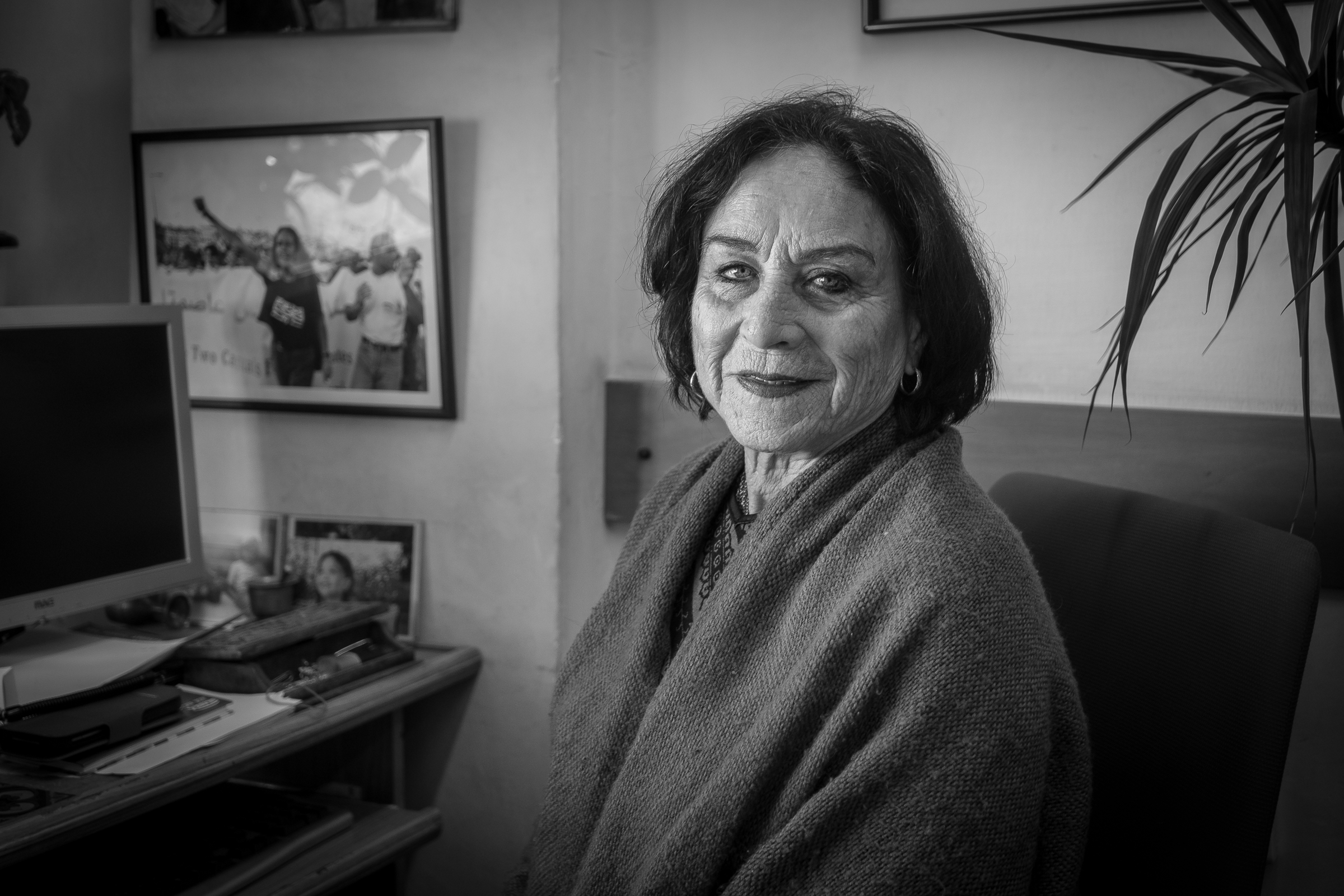
- Leah Tsemel (2019)
- Born: 19 June 1945 (age 81); Haifa, Mandatory Palestine (now Israel)
- Occupation: Lawyer
- Awards: Liberty, Equality, Fraternity award, Hans Litten prize

Leah Tsemel, or Lea Tsemel (Hebrew: לאה צמל; born 19 June 1945) is an Israeli lawyer known for her work in support of Palestinian rights. She defines her career as one involving “everything [that occurs] between the Palestinians and the authorities". Her five decades of representing Palestinian defendants in the Israeli court system is the subject of the documentary film Advocate, which came out in 2019, and won the 2021 Emmy for Best Documentary.

== Biography ==
Tsemel was born in Haifa, Mandatory Palestine in 1945. Her parents, who made aliyah in the 1930s, came from Belarus and Poland, and her father was an engineer. She studied law at Hebrew University in the late 1960s. She is married to anti-Zionist activist Michel Warschawski, and they have two children, Nissan and Talila and seven grandchildren.

== Legal work ==
In 1971, Tsemel became an apprentice to human rights lawyer Felicia Langer.

Tsemel represented activist Ezra Nawi. An Israeli settler claimed Nawi hindered the settler from filming Nawi's assistance of Palestinians, and Nawi was convicted and fined. On appeal, Tsemel successfully argued that the area the Palestinians were farming did not belong to the settler. Nawi's conviction was overturned.

Tsemel represented student Salah Hamouri after he was indicted on two counts: for planning to assassinate rabbi Ovadia Yosef and for being a member of the Popular Front for the Liberation of Palestine. She advised Hamouri to plead guilty to the latter in exchange for a lighter sentence.

Tsemel is "nondiscriminating about her clientele...whoever they might be and whatever charges they might face" and is known for defending suicide bombers.

== Activism ==
Tsemel criticized Camp 1391, an Israel Defense Forces prison camp for high-risk prisoners in northern Israel, stating, "anyone entering the prison can be made to disappear, potentially forever, it's no different from the jails run by tinpot South American dictators." Tsemel was a participant in the Russell Tribunal on Palestine.

She was a candidate for the Joint List in the 2015 general election.

Tsemel’s career as an Israeli human-rights lawyer defending Palestinians is the subject of the 2019 documentary, Advocate, directed by Rachel Leah Jones and Philippe Bellaïche.

== Awards ==
Tsemel, together with Palestinian lawyer Raji Sourani, received the 1996 "Liberty, Equality, Fraternity" award, the highest human rights award granted by the government of France. Tsemel, together with Palestinian advocate Mohammad Na'amneh, received the 2004 Hans Litten prize from the European Association of Lawyers for Democracy and World Human Rights.
