= Najwan =

Najwan is a given name. Notable people with the name include:

- Najwan Darwish (born 1978), Arabic-language poet
- Najwan Ghrayib (born 1974), Arab-Israeli footballer
- Najwan Halimi (born 1985), Malaysian politician

== See also ==
- Najwa (disambiguation)
