= Salha Hamadin =

Palestinian writer

Salha Hamadin (Arabic: صالحة حمدين) is a Palestinian writer of the Jahalin Bedouin tribe. She lives in the West Bank.

In 2012, when she was 14 years old, her story Hantush won the Hans Christian Andersen Award.

== Personal life ==
Hamadin is a Jahalin Bedouin living in Wadi Abu Hindi, in Area C of the West Bank.

She is the daughter of Souleiman, a prisoner in Israel.

== Writing ==
In 2012, when she was 14 year old, Hamadin wrote Hantush; a story about a girl called Salha who lives in the occupied West Bank and whose family's home is demolished by a military bulldozer. Salha asks her pet lamb Hantush take her away from Palestine. The lamb takes Salha to Spain where she meets football player Lionel Messi. The story won the Hans Christian Andersen - Fairy Tale Bay competition.

She wrote the story after encouragement at a workshop delivered by Italian organisation Vento Di Terra and the Tamer Institute for Community Education.
