= Safad District =

Administrative district of Mandatory Palestine

Safad District قضاء صفد
- District of Mandatory Palestine
- 1920–1948
- Capital: Safad
- Area
  - Coordinates: 32.9704°N 35.5025°E
  - 1945: 696 km^{2} (269 sq mi)
- Population
  - 1904: 22,715
  - 1916: 32,137
  - 1922: 22,790
  - 1931: 39,713
  - 1945: 53,620
- History
  - Established: 1920
  - Disestablished: 1948
Preceded by	Succeeded by
Acre Sanjak	Northern District (Israel)
- Today part of: Israel

The Safad District (Hebrew: מחוז צפת; Arabic: قضاء صفد) was a district in the Mandatory Palestine. Its capital was the city of Safad.

== Demographics ==
Based on various censuses conducted by the governing authorities of Palestine, adherents of the different religious communities in the district numbered approximately as follows:

Religion	1904	1908	1916	1922	1931	1945
Islam	16,179	18,892	22,747	18,306	33,975	44,510
Judaism	3,671	4,146	6,079	3,844	3,678	6,700
Christianity	2,765	3,075	3,311	1,253	1,575	1,630
