= Sheikha Helawy =

Bedouin Palestinian author, poet and educator

- Native name: شيخة حليوى
- Born: 1968 (age 56–57) Dhail El E’rj (Near Haifa)
- Occupation: Writer
- Language: Arabic
- Education: Bachelor's degree and a master's degree in education and Arabic language.
- Alma mater: Nazareth Nuns High School in Haifa

Sheikha Helawy (Arabic: شيخة حليوى, born 1968) is a Palestinian writer and poet born into a Bedouin family in the village Dhail El E’rj, in the outskirts of Haifa. In 1989, she moved with her family to Jaffa. She is known as a prominent writer of Palestinian literature.

== Education and literary career ==
Helawy attended Nazareth Nuns High School in Haifa, and then pursued her bachelor's degree and master's degree in education and Arabic language. Later, she worked in the field of counselling and educational curricula.

Helawy published four storytelling collections, as well as a poetry collection: For her book Order C345, she received the Forum Award for Arabic Short Stories at its fourth session, valued at $20,000. Her 2023 collection They Fell Like Stars from the Sky presents eighteen stories that focus on girls and women at different stages of their lives. Many of them are Palestinian Bedouins from “unrecognized” villages, such as the village Dhail El E’rj, where Helawy was born, and later obliterated by the Israeli government.

In addition, some of her works were translated into various languages including Hebrew, English, German, and Bulgarian, and published in specialised journals. Furthermore, she participated in several literary events, including the Monte Carlo Doualiya International Poetry Spring Event, where she presented her poem titled Escape.

== Critical reception ==
Helawy's writings were considered to be characterised by self-narrative through the presence of the speaker's conscience, along with topics referring to their surroundings, emotions and intellectuality, along with being accurate with her descriptions.

Additionally, an article in Al-Arabi newspaper emphasised Helawy's plea that a Palestinian has the right to love, hate and imagine. Other critics pointed out that she did not tend to portray the places she describes as a perfect portrayal. Furthermore, critics described her writing and diction as containing irony, referring to one of her short story collections with a "monotonous, pale, and ordinary title", but at the same time presenting "strong emotions" of joy, dancing, and love.

Throughout the stories in the [They Fell Like Stars from the Sky], this “certain understanding of happiness” is hard-won. In the opening stories, girls are at the edge of adolescence, trying to find space for their personal and shared joys in a highly judgmental world. Girls are weighed and measured not only by their parents, but also by their brothers, the nuns at school, their aunts and uncles, and every pair of nearby eyes.

— Marcia Lynx Qualey, They Fell Like Stars from the Sky. Sheikha Helawy's "Certain Understanding of Happiness", ArabLit magazine

== Works ==
- The Ladies of the Dark (2015) (Arabic original title: )سيدات العتمة
- The Window's are Bad Books (2016) (النوافذ كُتب رديئة)
- Outside of Classes is Where I Learned to Fly (2016) (خارج الفصول تعلمتُ الطيران)
- Order C345 (2018) (الطلبية C345)
- They Fell Like Stars from the Sky & Other Stories, translated by Nancy Roberts, Neem Tree Press 2023, ISBN 9781915584014

== See also ==
- Palestinian literature
