= Israa Jaabis =

Palestinian prisoner

- Occupation: Prisoner
- Known for: Convicted for the 2015 car explosion incident in Jerusalem
- Penalty: 11 years imprisonment

Israa Jaabis (Arabic: إسراء جعابيص) is a Palestinian woman who was imprisoned in Israel from 2015 to 2023. Jaabis seriously injured herself and Israeli police officer Moshe Chen when she allegedly detonated a car bomb in 2015, according to Israeli authorities. Her family, however, claims that the fire originated from a fault in her car.

According to the Israeli police, Jaabis, then a 31-year-old Palestinian, planned to detonate a gas tank near a soldiers' hitchhiking station close to Ma'ale Adumim. According to the Shin Bet, officer Moshe Chen stopped Jaabis's car, at which point she yelled "Allahu Akbar" and detonated the bomb. Chen, who sustained injuries in the attack, including burns to his face and chest, received a commendation from the police for his actions. Jaabis was evacuated to a hospital in Jerusalem with burns to her entire body. The Shin Bet reported that notes expressing support for "martyrs" were discovered on Jaabis.

According to Jaabis's lawyer, her objective may have been "suicide by cop" rather than a politically-motivated attack. Al Arabiya and other Arab media published a version in which the car's engine failed, causing a fire that ignited butane tanks she was transporting for personal use, and Jaabis was not permitted to leave the vehicle.

In an Israeli prison, having suffered serious facial burns, she put forward requests for facial surgery to reconstruct her features. However, these requests were turned down by Israel's prison authorities, according to the BBC.

On 26 November 2023, Jaabis was released as part of a prisoner swap between Hamas and the Israeli government in exchange for Israeli hostages held in Gaza. She had been released eight years into her sentence, and upon receiving freedom, she was pictured hugging her son Mua'tassim, 15, who was eight years old at the time of his mother's detainment.

== Victim ==
Moshe Chen, the traffic police officer who was injured in the explosion, was left with lasting physical disabilities. After the attack, Chen was acknowledged for his service with a commendation from the Israeli police chief. He initially received a 48% temporary disability rating, primarily due to leg injuries sustained in the attack, one of which required surgery. Despite medical intervention, Chen continued to have difficulty walking, climbing stairs, swimming, and engaging in daily activities. His challenges extended beyond physical recovery, as he had to confront issues regarding his rights and benefits with the Rehabilitation Department of the Israeli Ministry of Defense.

In 2023, Chen expressed mixed emotions upon learning about the release of Jaabis as part of a prisoner swap deal with Hamas for hostages held in Gaza. He described his feelings as conflicted: on one hand, he believed that Jaabis deserved to remain in prison for her actions, and said he still suffers from post-traumatic stress. On the other hand, he acknowledged the significance of saving hostages and expressed some solace in Jaabis having lost her fingers.

== Legal proceedings ==
According to the indictment, Jaabis was involved in "terrorist activities" as part of what was described as a "wave of terror against Israel" since September 2015. In 2014, she reportedly expressed support and admiration for "martyrs" on Facebook. On 10 October 2015, she decided to commit a terrorist attack against Jews or Israeli security forces, intending to die as a "martyr". She wrote a note stating, among other things, "Woe to you, enemies of God... your death is imminent, and I am with the convoy of martyrs for God".

The indictment further alleged that on 11 October 2015, around 4:30, after praying with her husband at their home in Jericho, she took a gas tank and a lighter she had bought the day before. She loaded the gas tank in her car and drove towards Jerusalem, intending to detonate the gas tank and cause severe physical harm to Jews and security personnel. Upon reaching the Adumim junction and entering a public transportation lane towards Jerusalem, she was signaled by Officer Chen in an unmarked police car to stop. The officer, in uniform, approached her vehicle to inquire about her travel in the public transportation lane and to request her documents. She then began chanting "Allahu Akbar". The officer, noticing white gas inside the vehicle, went to get a fire extinguisher. At that moment, she opened the gas valve and ignited the gas with her lighter, intending to cause an explosion and severe physical harm to the officer. A fire erupted, causing an explosion that threw the officer back and inflicted burns on his face and chest.

Jaabis confessed to the charges in the revised indictment and was convicted of attempted aggravated assault under Section 329(a)(1) combined with Section 25 of the Israeli Penal Law 5737-1977.

== In popular culture ==
Jaabis's story was featured in a documentary film Advocate in 2019. According to the film, Jaabis loaded butane tanks into the backseat of her car one morning and drove into Jerusalem, where she set the car on fire. Israeli prosecutors interpreted Jaabis' actions as a botched suicide bombing and terrorism attempt intended to kill Jewish people. However, the lawyer Lea Tsemel, who took on Jaabis' case, questioned whether her intent was actually to commit an act of violence. Tsemel learned from Jaabis' relatives that she was depressed and unhappy in her marriage, and had attempted suicide twice before. Tsemel wondered if this time Jaabis had intended "suicide by cop" rather than a politically-motivated attack. However, the court was not convinced, and ruled that her sole intent was to kill.

== See also ==
- Shorouq Dwayyat
