= Rawda Al-Farkh Al-Hudhud =

Jordanian writer

- Born: 1946 (age 79–80); Jaffa (present day Israel)
- Occupation: Writer
- Writing career
- Language: Arabic

Rauta Fahim Mohammed Al-Fahrah, better known as Rawda Al-Farkh Al-Hudhud (Arabic: روضة الهدهد; born 1946) is a Jordanian writer of Palestinian origin.

== Biography ==
=== Personal life ===
Farah was born in 1946 in Jaffa, Palestine. In 1967, she married Hussam Al Din Dahar Al Hudhud, an engineer.

=== Career ===
She was the chairperson of the board of directors of the Manhal Education Foundation. Farah also served as a member of the International Children and Youth Book Commission (IBBY) and a board member of the Arab League for Childhood and Development. She has authored several books for children, including heroic tales and science genius stories.

=== Awards ===
In 1999, she received the Oman State Prize for Children's Literature. Farah has also won other awards, such as the Khalil Al Saqi Jordanian Writers Union Award for Children's Literature and Culture and the Arab Organization's Educational, Cultural and Science Award.
