= Najwa Kawar Farah =

Palestinian writer

- نجوى قعوار فرح
- Born: Najwa Kawar; April 30, 1923; Nazareth Palestine
- Died: August 1, 2015 (aged 92); Toronto, Canada
- Occupations: Writer, educator

Najwa Kawar Farah (Arabic: نجوى قعوار فرح), (April 30, 1923 - August 1, 2015) was a Palestinian educator and writer.

She was born Najwa Kawar in Nazareth and was educated there, later attending the Teachers' Academy in Jerusalem. She taught school in Nazareth. She married Reverend Rafiq Farah in 1950; the couple produced the magazine al-Ra'id in 1967. Farah also wrote articles for the press and for radio. She lived in Haifa until the mid-1960s, when she left the region.

The family moved to Jerusalem in 1965, then to Beirut in 1977 and to London in 1986. Since 1998, they lived in Scarborough in Ontario, Canada.

She died on August 1, 2015, in Toronto, Canada.

== Selected works ==
- 'Abiru al-sabil (The passersby), short stories (1954)
- Durub masabih (Lamp paths), short stories (1956)
- Mudhakkirat rihla (Memoirs of journey), autobiography (1957)
- Sirr Shahrazad (Sheherazade's secret), play (1958)
- Malik al-majd (King of glory), play (1961)
- Li-man al-rabi'? (Who owns spring), short stories (1963)
- Silsilat qisas li-I-ashbal (A series of stories for young ones), children's literature (1963–65), 3 volumes
- Intifadat al- 'asafir (The sparrow's uprising), short stories (1991)
- Sukkan al-tabiq al- 'ulwi (The people upstairs), novel (1996)
