= Daniel Smales =

British Actor

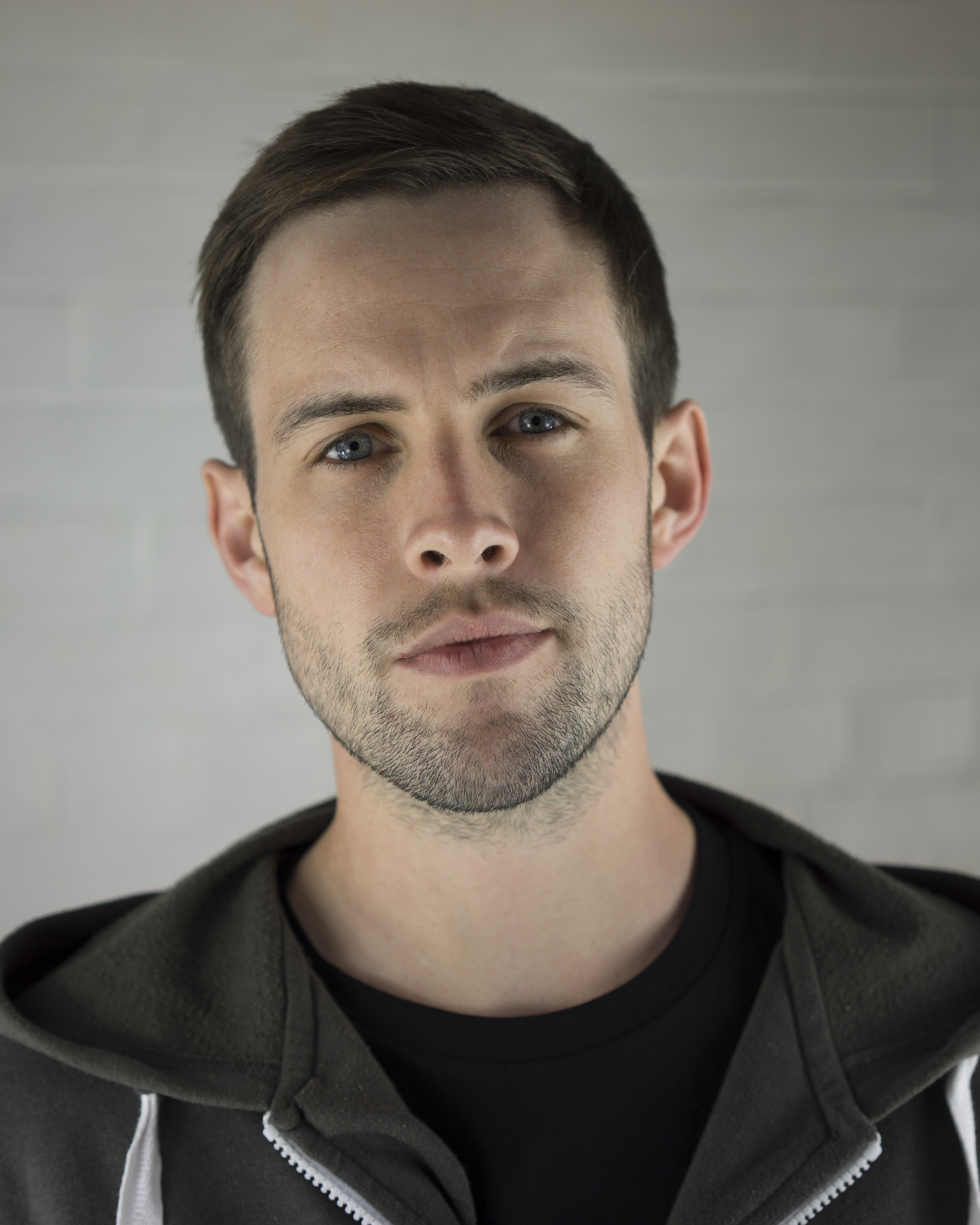
- Smales in 2016
- Born: 21 October 1990 (age 35); Kingston upon Hull, Yorkshire, England
- Education: Wyke College; Hull College
- Alma mater: Trinity Laban
- Occupation(s): Actor, singer
- Years active: 2011–present
- Known for: Death Walks; No Reasons
- Height: 5 ft 10 in (178 cm)
- Parents: Anthony Smales (father); Margaret Smales (mother)
- Website: Official website

Daniel Smales (born 21 October 1990) is an English actor. His work includes a range of stage and film.

== Career ==
Smales auditioned and gained a place to study musical theatre at Trinity Laban Conservatoire of Music and Dance. He was also accepted into Royal Academy of Music, but was forced to turn his place down due to not being able to fund his place. Following that decision, he embarked on his passion for film.

His first film role was for Death Walks (2016) independent film developed by first-time writer and director Spencer Hawken. He auditioned for the role of "Steve", the shop assistant, alongside love interest "Louise" (Lucinda Rhodes).

He played the character of "Kevin" a journalist in No Reasons (2016). One review of the film compliments "an admirably creepy performance by Daniel Smales". In an interview with Hull Daily Mail, Smales shared how the character was based on an old school teacher. Expressing that the characteristics of the slicked hair, jackets and pointed shoes the character wears inspired the characteristics in the film. In an interview with Nerdly, Smales revealed he didn't sleep for the first night after reading the original script, debating whether this role was right for him. In the same interview Spencer Hawken revealed Smales had designed the artwork for the release of the film.

Smales appeared in the Hyundai commercial (2018). Smales also appeared in Gogodoc commercial (2018).

Smales was in Hull's Cool List 2021.

Since 2023, Smales has been part of the team at Romford Film Festival and Romford Horror Film Festival.

In October 2024, as festival director, Smales announced the development of the Glowflare Short Film Festival, a new platform for emerging filmmakers. In addition, Smales launched the Glowflare Horror Film Festival, which held its inaugural edition in May 2025.

== Personal ==
Smales was born in Kingston upon Hull in East Yorkshire, where he grew up on the Orchard Park Estate. He is the son of Anthony Smales and Margaret Smales. He has an older sister and an older brother. He attended the local Shaw Park Primary School, along with the local secondary school Sir Henry Cooper School. He attended Wyke Sixth Form College where he studied performing arts and information technology. Smales took a year at Hull College studying musical theatre. He left Hull to pursue his career in London. Smales is known to have Dyslexia.

== Charity ==
Smales is an advocate for Alzheimer's supporting the charities Alzheimer's Research UK and Alzheimer's Society. Smales father died of Alzheimer's disease in December 2021. In an interview with Hull Live Smales paid tribute to his 'selfless and caring' dad Tony, and believes Investment in dementia research remains low compared to other major health conditions across the United Kingdom.

== Credits ==
=== Film ===
†	Films that have not yet been released.

Year	Title	Role	Notes
2016	Death Walks	Steve	VFTE Films / Amazon Prime
2016	No Reasons	Kevin	VFTE Films / Amazon Prime
2018	Obstacles	Arthur	SCA Productions (Short Film)
2018	The Last Supper	Adam	Raines Productions (Short Film)
2018	Do No Harm	Daniel	Blue Goose (Short Film)
2026	Destitute †	Dominic	Glowflare (Short Film)

=== Stage ===
Year	Title	Role	Notes
2011	The Threepenny Opera	Macheath	Blackheath Halls
2011	Cinderella	The Herald	Blackheath Halls
2012	Sunday in the Park with George	Mr. / Lee	Blackheath Halls
2012	Honk!	Drake	Tour
2012	Grand Hotel	Erik	Stratford Circus
2012	Bright Lights, Bit City	Chuck Bean	Albany Theatre
2013	An Act of Love	Dominic Jones	Blackheath Halls
2013	The Witches of Eastwick	Raymond	Stratford Circus

=== Commercial ===
Year	Title	Role	Notes
2018	Hyundai i10 – Grab your friends	Tom	Gravity Thinking / Hyundai Motor Company
2018	Gogodoc – A Doctor at your doorstep	Jack	Askdoc
