= Lorraine Stanley =

English actress (born 1976)

Lorraine Perez
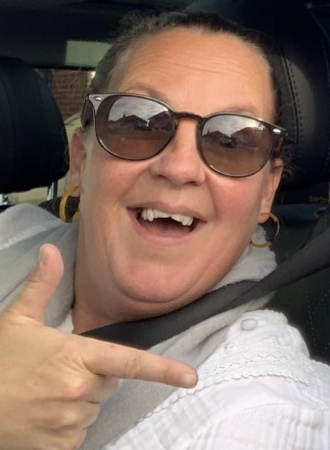
- Stanley in 2021
- Born: Lorraine Marie Stanley; 28 June 1976 (age 50); Portsmouth, England, United Kingdom
- Education: Arts Educational Schools
- Years active: 1999–present
- Spouse: Mark Perez (m. 2025)
- Children: 1

Lorraine Marie Perez (born 28 June 1976) is a British actress from Portsmouth, England, known for playing Kelly in the 2006 film London to Brighton and Karen Taylor in the BBC soap opera EastEnders (2017–2024, 2026).

== Early life ==
Lorraine Marie Stanley was born on 28 June 1976 in Portsmouth, the daughter of June (née Almy), and David Stanley. She was brought up in Portsmouth by her parents, who divorced when she was ten years old. She has Scottish, English and Polish ancestry from her father and mother respectively. She then trained at London's Arts Educational Schools.

== Career ==
Stanley made her acting debut in 2000, when she appeared in the crime drama film Gangster No. 1 in a minor role as the attacker's friend. She also appeared in episodes of The Bill and London's Burning.

In 2006, Stanley took the lead role in the neo-noir crime film London to Brighton. She portrayed Kelly, a prostitute who is coerced into procuring an 11-year-old girl for a paedophile.

In 2014, Stanley was cast to play the role of Simone in Spencer Hawken's 2016 film No Reasons.

=== EastEnders ===
In 2004, Stanley appeared as a young Mo Harris in the EastEnders spin off Pat and Mo which aired in April 2004 and revealed what caused the feud between Mo and sister-in-law Pat Butcher, who was played by Emma Cooke.

In 2016, Stanley appeared in EastEnders as Thelma Bragg, the mother of Linzi Bragg who enters an illegal relationship with Jay Brown (Jamie Borthwick). She appeared in eight episodes.

A year later, Stanley returned to EastEnders, this time on a permanent basis portraying Karen Taylor, the head of the newly introduced Taylor family, who arrived in June 2017. In July 2023, it was announced that Stanley had been "written out" of the show after six years, and Stanley's final scenes aired on 8 December 2023. She returned to the series for two guest stints in 2024.

== Personal life ==
Stanley and her partner Mark Perez have been together since 2014, and have a daughter born in 2015. The couple married in August 2025.

== Filmography ==
Film
Year	Title	Role	Notes
2000	Gangster No. 1	Attacker's Friend	
2001	Royalty	Kelly	Short film
2006	London to Brighton	Kelly	Lead role Nominated—2006 London Film Critics Circle Award for British Actress of the Year
2008	Eden Lake	Nat	
2008	Cass	Linda	
2009	Three Moments in Heaven	Woman	Short film
2009	In Passing	Maureen	Short film
2010	Rough Cut	Prison councillor	Short film
2010	Dead Cert	Chelle	
2010	Made in Dagenham	Monica	
2011	Big Fat Gypsy Gangster	Flossy	Straight-to-DVD film
2012	The Devil's Dosh	Gertrude	Short film
2013	The Gift	Cyclist	Short film
2014	He Who Dares	Marie	
2014	Top Dog	Julie	
2014	The Hooligan Factory	Sharon	
2014	The Guvnors	Cheryl	
2014	The Hooligan Wars	Cookie	
2014	Essex Boys Retribution	Regina	
2015	Riot	Drake's mother	
2015	Suffragette	Mrs. Coleman	
2015	Legend	Blind Beggar Barmaid	
2016	Wee King of Nowhere	Mum	Short film
2016	100 Streets	Tina	
2016	The Receptionist	Helen	
2016	No Reasons	Simone	
2018	Trigger Finger!	Tanya	Short film
2019	Break Clause	Christy	
2025	Departures	Janet	

Television
Year	Title	Role	Notes
2001	The Life and Adventures of Nicholas Nickleby	Maid	Television film
2001	The Bill	Michelle Piper	Episode: "Happy and Glorious"
2001	Anybody's Nightmare	Prison Officer 2, Holloway	Television film
2002	London's Burning	Fran	Season 14, Episode 8
2003	Rehab	Sonya	Television film
2004	EastEnders: Pat and Mo	Young Mo Harris	TV special EastEnders spin-off
2004	Making Waves	Wessex Sailor	Season 1, Episode 1
2007	Casualty	Linda Grogan	Episode: "No Return"
2007	A Class Apart	Mandy	Television film
2007	The Life and Times of Vivienne Vyle	Unnamed	Season 1, Episode 4
2007	The Inspector Lynley Mysteries	Maggie	Episode: "Know Thine Enemy"
2008	Trial & Retribution	Sarah Randal	2 episodes
2008	He Kills Coppers	Stan's wife	Television film
2008	Waking the Dead	Susan Carlyle	2 episodes
2008	The Bill	Kim Yates	Episode: "Lifesaver"
2010	Casualty	Izzy McQueen	Episode: "Last Roll of the Dice"
2010	Law & Order: UK	Julie Reid	Episode: "Broken"
2011	Coming Up	Mary	Episode: "Home"
2012	Call the Midwife	Pearl Winston	Season 1, Episode 1
2012	Casualty	Janel Abel	Episode: "The Blame Game"
2013	Way to Go	Betty with Dog	Episode: "The Bitter End"
2013	Mayday	Angie	TV mini-series; 3 episodes
2013	The Tunnel	Dean Atkinson's mother	Season 1, Episode 6
2014	Doctors	Liz McWhinnie	3 episodes
2014	Chasing Shadows	Kay Amos	TV mini-series; 2 episodes
2014	Babylon	Sandy	Season 1, Episode 3
2015	Holby City	Casey Williams	Episode: "Infallible"
2015	Cradle to Grave	Jean	Season 1, Episode 6
2016	EastEnders	Thelma Bragg	8 episodes
2017–2024, 2026	EastEnders	Karen Taylor	Series regular 2018 British Soap Award for Best Newcomer; 2019 Inside Soap Award for Funniest Female; 2020 Inside Soap Award for Funniest Performance; Shortlisted—2018 Inside Soap Award for Funniest Female; Shortlisted—2019 British Soap Award for Best Actress; Shortlisted—2019 TV Choice Award for Best Soap Actress; Longlisted—2019 Inside Soap Award for Best Actress
2020	EastEnders: Secrets from the Square	Herself	Episodes: "Tiffany, Keegan and Karen" and "Karen, Chantelle and Gray"

== Theatre ==
Year	Title	Role	Notes
1999	Widowers' Houses		National Theatre, UK tour
2004	To Kill A Mockingbird	Scout	Mercury Theatre, Colchester
2008	Days of Significance		Tricycle Theatre
2008	The Frontline	Val	Shakespeare's Globe
2008	Mine		Shared Experience
2014	Wildefire	Gail Wilde	Hampstead Theatre
2024	Dick Whittington – Pompey Panto		Portsmouth Kings Theatre
