= No Reasons =

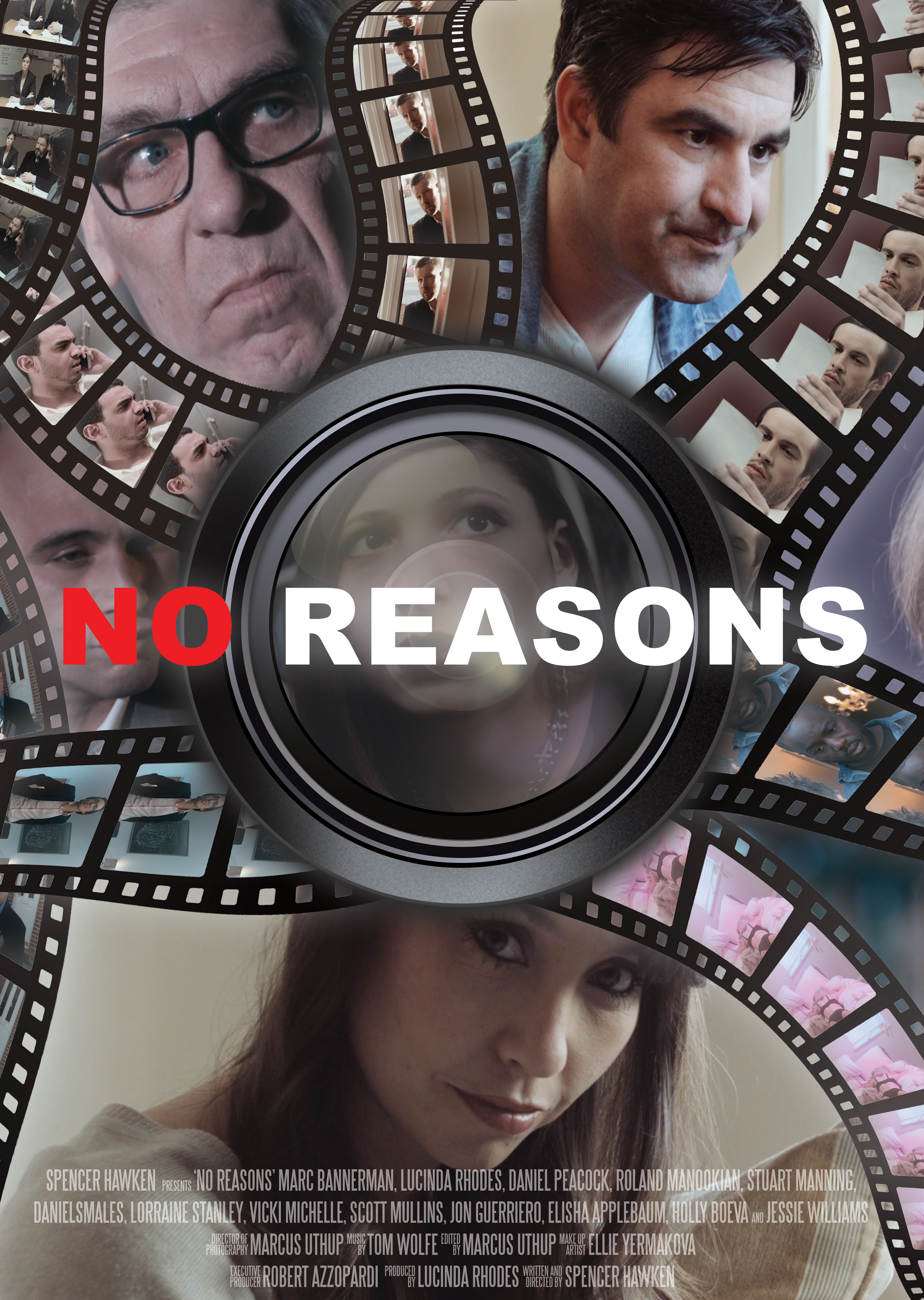
- Theatrical release poster
- Directed by: Spencer Hawken
- Written by: Spencer Hawken
- Produced by: Robert Azzopardi; Spencer Hawken; Lucinda Rhodes; Elizabeth Blake-Thomas; Paul Ducker; Claire Wolfe
- Starring: Marc Bannerman; Lucinda Rhodes; Elisha Applebaum; Emily Lloyd; Roland Manookian; Stuart Manning; Daniel Peacock; Lorraine Stanley; Vicki Michelle
- Cinematography: Marcus Uthup
- Edited by: Marcus Uthup
- Music by: Tom Wolfe
- Production company: Views From The Edge Films
- Distributed by: Amazon Prime Video
- Release date: 19 August 2016
- Running time: 131 minutes
- Country: United Kingdom
- Language: English
- Budget: £13,156

No Reasons is an independent thriller film written and directed by Spencer Hawken. The film was created with Hawkens production company Views From The Edge Films. It stars Marc Bannerman, Lucinda Rhodes, Emily Lloyd, Elisha Applebaum, Daniel Peacock, Roland Manookian, Stuart Manning, Lorraine Stanley and Vicki Michelle.

== Plot ==
In a quiet London suburb, Jodie the daughter of Paul and Sally fails to return home, and the disappearance is totally unexpected. They anxiously await her return home. The family begin to struggling with their loss, and the impending debts they incur as a result. As Maurice, a private investigator, explores the mortuaries for clues, he uncovers a shadowy realm and a dreadful secret. Julian the gang leader is keeping his cards close to his chest while manipulating and exploiting Sally behinds Paul’s back. The same is happening to Paul in his workplace with his boss Simone. A teacher Mr. Taylor knows more about Jodie than he’s told and unfolds secrets which will destroy his career over night. The local news reporter Kevin keeps a close eye on the developments of the missing daughter and uses this to his advantage and nothing is ever truly as it seems.

== Cast ==
- Marc Bannerman as Paul
- Lucinda Rhodes as Sally
- Elisha Applebaum as Jodie
- Daniel Peacock as Maurice
- Roland Manookian as Julian
- Stuart Manning as Robin
- Lorraine Stanley as Simone
- Vicki Michelle as Dr. Victoria Spencer
- Daniel Smales as Kevin
- Jon Guerriero as Mr. Taylor
- Emily Lloyd as Yvonne
- Dexter Koh as Dexter
- Louise Michelle as PC Claire Coogan
- Jazz Lintott as Raj
- Jessie Williams as Angel
- Scott Mullins as DI Mike Cooper

== Production ==
Hawken began work on No Reasons in the autumn of 2013 after his first feature film debut Death Walks. As of November 2013 the film's budget was £30,000 with several names connected. The film went into pre-production in January 2014 in the same month Hawken and Rhodes began casting the film. Hawken cast Daniel Smales, Jon Guerriero and Scott Mullins from his previous award winning zero budget film. As of January 2014, Daniel Peacock and Jessie Williams roles had been confirmed. In February 2014 the film's casting process was complete, confirming the additional cast of Roland Manookian, Elisha Applebaum, Lorraine Stanley, Jazz Lintott, Daniel Peacock, Dexter Koh, Jessie Williams, and Holly Boeva.

Filming began in 2014 across multiple locations in Romford, Hornchurch and Brentwood, Essex. Hawken developed skills and relationships acquired during the shooting his first zero-budget film (Death Walks), and decided to keep No Reasons a local project. In the process of making the film, Hawken utilised local venues, including The Brickyard and Mercury Mall in Romford, and Fairkytes Arts Centre in Hornchurch. Hawken also used the houses of friends and acquaintances to create a backdrop of the story. The filming was scheduled over 14 days.

As of May 2014 the budget had changed to £25,000, and many of the actors lowered their fee to be part of the film. More roles had been announced, with the confirmation of Vicki Michelle, Anna Karen, and Stuart Manning.

During the filming, the budget ran out. This resulted in three unfinished scenes, leaving the film 95% complete. A Kickstarter was created to help complete the production process, and it raised a further £3,165.

During an interview at Phoenix FM with Spencer Hawken before filming began, he revealed that the film is loosely based on a true story that had deeply disturbed him. He added that the best kind of horror is the kind that is unbelievable but can really happen. Filming was scheduled to be completed in March 2014 with film completion September 2014.

Hawken cast Marc Bannerman, pairing up with Bannerman’s A Landscape of Lies co-stars Lucinda Rhodes and Daniel Peacock. Hawken said when he presented the script to Bannerman he didn’t sleep for days reading the script.

No Reasons was completed on 29 June 2016 with a final cost of £13,156.

== Release ==
No Reasons premiered on 19 August 2016 at Premiere Cinemas in Romford. The film screened on 27 May 2018 at the Romford Film Festival.

It was publicly released on Amazon Prime Video platform in the UK on 15 January 2021 and in the USA on 9 February 2021. The film was then released across Europe on 29 April 2021.

In an interview with Nerdly after the film's release, actors Daniel Smales & Jon Guerriero revealed they didn't sleep for a while after reading the original script. Smales debated whether this role was right for him. In the same interview Hawken revealed Smales had designed the artwork as part of the film's release.

In an interview with Hull Daily Mail, Smales shared how the characteristics of the slicked hair, jackets and pointed shoes was based on an old school teacher.

== Reception ==
The film's release in the UK received positive critical reviews in 2016 after the film's premier FromPage2Screen said: "No Reasons is what they call a ‘slow burner’ where it doesnt set off at a rockets speed, and instead builds up and works like a pressure cooker. No Reasons is shot on a very low budget but you really cant tell."

Following the film's release on Amazon Prime in 2021, Nerdly stated: The movie covers some pretty despicable characters. It's great to see Mark Bannerman stretching himself and doing something completely different believe me this is different. "It's a pretty solid movie it looks good, it sounds good."

== See also ==
- Spencer Hawken
- Death Walks
