= Cavegirl =

2002–03 British TV series

- Genre: Children's television series
- Directed by: Daniel Peacock
- Starring: Stacey Cadman; Stephen Marcus; Lucinda Rhodes-Flaherty
- Country of origin: United Kingdom
- Original language: English
- No. of series: 2
- No. of episodes: 38

Production
- Producer: Georgia Dussaud
- Production location: South Africa

Original release
- Network: BBC One; CBBC
- Release: 31 August 2002 – 2003

Cavegirl is a 2002–03 British TV series created and written by Daniel Peacock. It starred Stacey Cadman, Stephen Marcus and Lucinda Rhodes-Flaherty. It followed the adventures of a teenage cavegirl. Although based in a Stone Age world, there are many references to modern pop culture and in a similar vein to The Flintstones there are many ancient versions of modern inventions featured. Its theme tune is a cover version of "Go Wild in the Country", sung by Stacey Cadman. It was developed by Dan and Producer Georgia Dussaud. Daniel Peacock's production company Two Hats Film and TV eventually produced. It featured many of the same actors that also appeared in Peacock's other productions, such as Harry and Cosh and Billie: Girl from the Future.

== Plot ==
The main characters are Cavegirl herself and her family Dad, Mum, Big Sis, Gran and Little Bro. Other tribe members feature prominently. Cavegirl is a pretty, feisty individual and a bit of a tomboy although during the series she begins to become interested in boys and many of the storylines involve her becoming more mature. Big Sis is very interested in her appearance and how boys see her. She is also rather shallow. Dad is the stereotypical rugged caveman, although he is protective of his children, and is the chief of the tribe. Mum is a little dozy and Gran is very young at heart and more than a little crazy. Little Brother is curious about the world and often annoys Cavegirl immensely.

In season 2, Dad has left to look for new hunting grounds, and a new character, "Chief", has replaced him. In a flashback episode near the end of the season it was shown that Dad left Mum in charge, but she lost a bet with "The Chief of the Tribe to the North" and the tribes merged to form a larger one.

== Cast ==
- Stacey Cadman – Cavegirl
- Lucinda Rhodes-Flaherty – Big Sis
- Stephen Marcus – Dad (season 1)
- Jennifer Guy – Mum
- Kenneth Collard – Chief (season 2)
- Gabrielle Downey – Gran
- Chad Burton – Little Bro
- Brett Goldin – Pigball Star Player
- T.J. Sorrell – Sticks the Saucy
- Paul Leyshon – Trunk the Tasty
- Harry Capehorn – Roast the Rugged
- Tanya Baleson – Netal
- Daniel Peacock – Roast's father

== Filming ==
Cavegirl was filmed in Western Cape Province, South Africa, based around Cape Town. Locations included Cederberg, Stadsaal Caves and the pools at Tweede Tol. In 2004 the Cavegirl series won The Children's Award at the BBC's 12th Annual Awards Ceremony for Independent Producers. It was aired on the BBC in the UK, BBC Kids in Canada and British Forces Broadcasting Service throughout the world. The BBC released a DVD and VHS containing some of the episodes entitled Cavegirl Rocks! on 30 June 2003.

== Proposed film version ==
Producer Andy Bell later acquired all IP rights to Cavegirl and Cavegirl: The Movie (screenplay developed with the BFI, but has not yet been produced to date).

== See also ==
- List of BBC children's television programmes
- Plebs, a later British comedy series of a similar concept set in Ancient Rome
