= Marc Bannerman =

Irish born actor

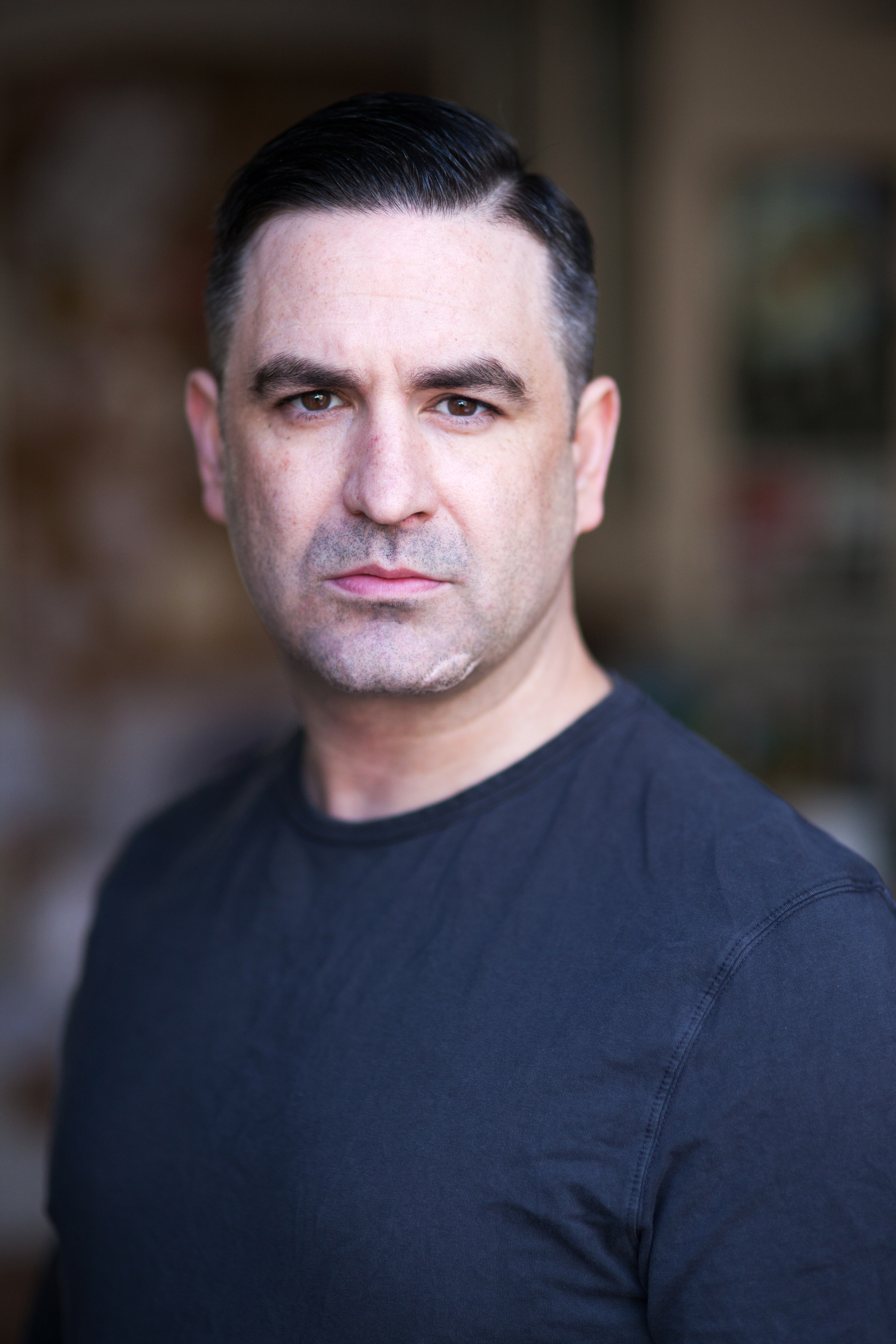
- Born: 15 August 1973 (age 52); Dublin, Ireland
- Occupation: Actor

Marc Bannerman (born 15 August 1973) is an Irish-born British actor. He played Gianni di Marco in the BBC soap opera EastEnders. His character was introduced in 1998, but was written out three years later by the executive producer of EastEnders, John Yorke. He has since appeared on various television and reality television programmes, including I'm a Celebrity... Get Me Out of Here! in 2007. He starred as Patsy Richardson in the TV show Snatch based on the film by Guy Ritchie. He also appeared in Sky One's Agatha Raisin as the victim PC Beech in 2020.

== Early life ==
Although Bannerman was born in Dublin, he spent his childhood in North London. A keen boxer, he boxed for Islington Boxing Club in his youth.

== Career ==
Whilst training at The Courtyard Theatre Company, he played a variety of roles ranging from Palamon in The Canterbury Tales to performing in Nosferatu. This diversity followed him into his career with television performances as Paul in The Stalkers Apprentice, Gangster in On the Eighth Ball, Phil in The Bill and Malcolm in Chalk for the BBC.

In 1997, Bannerman auditioned for the role of Gianni di Marco, a member of a new Italian family introduced to the BBC's award-winning serial drama EastEnders. He got the part by telling the producers he was half-Italian and half-Sardinian. He first appeared on screen in January 1998 and remained in the role until 2000.

Bannerman appeared in two series of the comedy series Time Gentlemen Please alongside Julia Sawalha, Phil Daniels and Al Murray. He also appeared as his idol Elvis Presley in Celebrity Stars in their eyes. He has presented Wish You Were Here...? for ITV, and has also played guest leads in The Grimleys and Dream Team on Sky One. He has made appearances in the BBC hospital drama Holby City, in the ITV2 drama Footballers' Wives: Extra Time, the ITV game-show Celebrity Wrestling and Hotel Babylon (2008).

Stage appearances include David Freeman in In Two Minds at the Theatre Royal, Windsor and the Churchill Theatre, Bromley. Bannerman received four stars from The Times in 2016 for his return to the stage as Shylock in The Merchant of Venice. He has also worked at new writing powerhouse Theatre503 in London, in The Acedian Pirates.

In November 2007, Bannerman was a contestant on the 7th series of the ITV reality show, "I'm a Celebrity... Get Me Out of Here!", a popularity contest that transports various celebrities to the Australian jungle to undergo unpleasant trials. He was persuaded to enter by his former EastEnders co-star Dean Gaffney, who appeared in the 2006 series. Bannerman was first to be voted out of the jungle.

He appeared in the film A Landscape of Lies (which unbeknown to him) was part of an elaborate scheme.

In 2014 he took the leading role in Spencer Hawken's No Reasons reuniting Bannerman with Landscape Of Lies co-stars Lucinda Rhodes and Daniel Peacock.

Recent projects include indie feature 24 Little Hours, and he has two projects in development for 2018; The Dark Return of Time and Godfathers of London

== Personal life ==
Bannerman has stated that he suffered from depression after leaving EastEnders in 2000.

His two-year relationship with fellow Footballers Wives – Extra Time actor Sarah Matravers ended publicly in 2007, when Bannerman appeared on ITV reality show I'm a Celebrity... Get Me Out of Here! and professed his love for fellow contestant Cerys Matthews.

== Charity Work ==
Bannerman is a board member of the charity Product of A Postcode which helps children achieve their dreams through education. The aims and goals of Product of A Postcode is to work with underprivileged children through schools, sports clubs, youth clubs and community centres.
