= Vicki Michelle =

British actress (born 1950)

Vicki Michelle MBE
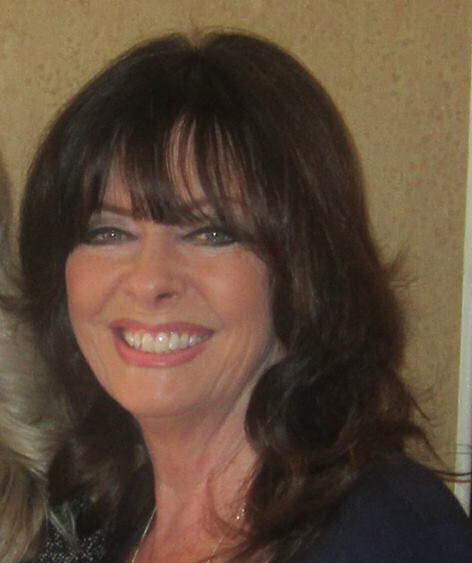
- Michelle in 2014
- Born: Michelle Vicki Nathan; 14 December 1950 (age 75); Chigwell, Essex, England
- Education: Aida Foster Theatre School
- Occupations: Actress; radio presenter; businesswoman; film producer
- Years active: 1968–present
- Television: 'Allo 'Allo! (1982–92); Emmerdale (2007–09); I'm a Celebrity...Get Me Out of Here! (2014); EastEnders (2023)
- Spouse: Graham Fowler (m. 1974)
- Children: 1
- Relatives: Ann Michelle (sister)
- Website: vickimichelle.co.uk

Vicki Michelle (born Michelle Vicki Nathan; 14 December 1950) is an English actress, radio presenter, businesswoman, film producer and former model. She is best known for her role as Yvette Carte-Blanche in the BBC television comedy series 'Allo 'Allo! and as recurring character Patricia Foster in the ITV soap opera Emmerdale. In 2014, she appeared on the fourteenth series of I'm a Celebrity...Get Me Out of Here.

== Early life ==
The eldest of four daughters, Michelle was born in Chigwell, Essex. Her father Joseph was a fish trader at Billingsgate Fish Market and her mother Sheila an actress. One of her sisters is the actress and writer Ann Michelle. While her parents were at work, they employed an au-pair girl to look after Michelle and her three sisters; the girl they employed was future Hollywood actress Elke Sommer.

Michelle attended Knewnham Junior School in Wanstead and then West Hatch Technical High School. After O-levels she stayed on at school to complete a secretarial course. Hoping to become a ballet dancer, she joined the Aida Foster stage school.

== Acting career ==
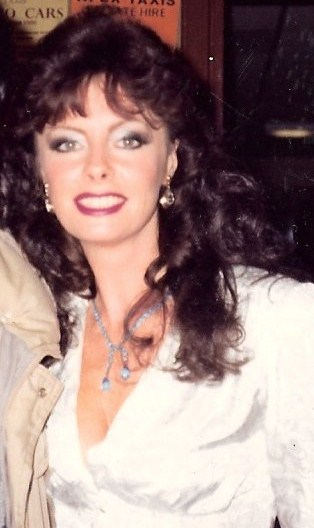
Michelle on tour in 'Allo 'Allo! in 1986

Michelle was given small television roles while still at stage school, the first being in Dixon of Dock Green. She followed this with an uncredited appearance dancing at a party in The Haunted House of Horror (1969), and a role in the play Play It Again, Sam with Dudley Moore in the West End from 1969 to 1970. Michelle then had appeared in three different episodes of Softly, Softly: Task Force and also as Terry Collier's girlfriend in Whatever Happened to the Likely Lads? in 1974. She also had a starring role alongside her sister Ann in the horror film Virgin Witch (1972) before appearing with Joan Collins in Alfie Darling (1975), the sequel to Alfie (1966). Michelle then appeared in big-screen versions of English sitcoms The Likely Lads (1976) as a hitch-hiker with Penny Irving and George and Mildred (1980) as a girl in bed with the vicar. She also appeared regularly in the 1970s children's BBC TV series Crackerjack. Throughout the 1970s and 1980s, Michelle worked as a glamour model and a pin-up model.

Following a small role in Space: 1999, Michelle appeared in the films Queen Kong (1976), The Sentinel (1977) and Spectre with John Hurt before appearing in an episode of The Goodies as a nurse. In 1976, she had a role in The Two Ronnies sketch "The Phantom Raspberry Blower of Old London Town". In 1978, Michelle appeared in the film The Greek Tycoon opposite Anthony Quinn; her role was initially larger than that in the finished film. After this, Michelle had a small role as a French robot maid in the sitcom Come Back Mrs. Noah which was written by David Croft and played Bodie's girlfriend in an episode of the drama The Professionals. Following a part in Minder, in which she played Sarah Jane in the episode Don't Tell Them Willie Boy Was Here, Michelle had a regular role as Sandra, Les Dawson's secretary, in the comedy sketch show The Dawson Watch from 1979 to 1980. In 1980, she had a recurring role in another The Two Ronnies sketch in which she played a state policewoman under the rule of a dystopian female leader played by Diana Dors.

Although the late sixties and seventies gave her success, Michelle gained significant attention, particularly in Ireland, after appearing as Sally O'Brien in a string of high-profile adverts for Harp Lager in the early 1980s. The slogan "Sally O'Brien and the way she might look at you" became synonymous with the company and brought Michelle to viewers' attention. There was a small outcry when it was revealed that the actress that played Sally O'Brien was in fact English, not Irish. Following on from this success, Michelle played the part of Millie in Priest of Love (1981) alongside Ava Gardner, John Gielgud and Ian McKellen before appearing in a second episode of The Professionals, in which she played Tina, the girlfriend of an organised crime boss played by John Junkin in the episode The Untouchables.

However, Michelle's big break was when she was offered the part of Yvette Carte-Blanche in the BBC sitcom 'Allo 'Allo!, produced and written by David Croft. Croft had remembered Michelle playing the French maid robot in an episode of his previous sitcom Come Back Mrs. Noah and offered her the role. Michelle played Yvette in all eighty-five episodes of the series from 1982 to 1992 as well as reprising the role in numerous stage plays based on the series. Although she was achieving high success, Michelle maintained an acting career alongside 'Allo, 'Allo!, and had roles in The Last Days of Pompeii, Cannon and Ball, The Little and Large Show and two episodes of the department store sitcom Are You Being Served? which was also written by David Croft. Michelle also appeared as Betty, a Cockney barmaid, in three episodes of The Kenny Everett Television Show. In 1985, Michelle toured in a production of Doctor in the House with Robin Askwith, Frazer Hines and Windsor Davies.

After 'Allo, 'Allo! ended in 1992, Michelle appeared on a number of episodes of Noel's House Party as Noel Edmonds's man-eating neighbour. In 1996, Michelle played Lucy Westenra in a production of Dracula alongside Leslie Grantham in the title role. In 2001, she played Miss Hannigan in a touring production of Annie; she would reprise the role in various tours of the production in 2005 and 2007.

In 2007 Michelle reprised the role of Yvette Carte-Blanche in The Return of 'Allo 'Allo! celebrating twenty-five years since the show was first broadcast. From 2007 to 2009, she played the recurring character Patricia Foster in the ITV soap opera Emmerdale. Later in 2007, she appeared in a Children in Need special of Hotel Babylon and, the following year, appeared on the BBC cookery programme Celebrity MasterChef. From 2008 to 2009, Michelle toured with the 'Allo 'Allo! stage show. She played the role of Amanda Newman in the 2010 TV film Resentment.

In 2013, she played Deborah Whitton in the 2013 romantic comedy film The Callback Queen. In 2014, Michelle returned to the stage in the hit play Hello Norma Jeane at London's King's Head Theatre, where she took on the role of an Essex grandma who claims to be Marilyn Monroe.

In 2014, Michelle was cast to play the role of Dr. Victoria Spencer in Spencer Hawken's 2016 film No Reasons.

In 2017, Michelle appeared in the gangster film Rise of the Footsoldier 3 and the short film Grimaldi: The Funniest Man in the World with The Chuckle Brothers.

In 2020, Michelle made her first appearance in the sitcom radio and podcast series Barmy Dale. She plays the recurring role of Angie Edwards.

In February 2023, it was announced that Michelle would be joining the BBC One soap opera EastEnders in spring 2023 for a short guest stint. It was later announced that Michelle would be playing Jo Cotton, the secret wife of Tom "Rocky" Cotton (Brian Conley). her first scenes aired on 29 March 2023.

== Other ventures ==
=== Charity work ===
Michelle has been involved in a number of charities and good causes. She was the longest-serving president of The Heritage Foundation and is the current president of the eastern region of the Lady Taverners. As well as being a member of the Grand Order Of Lady Ratlings, Michelle is also an ambassador for Keep Britain Tidy, the SSAFA, Wetnose Animal Aid, Homeless Worldwide and a patron of the Gordon Craig Theatre, Macmillan Cancer Support, Barnardo's, Age UK, Marie Curie Cancer Care, Sign2Sing, the Blackfish Academy, the Talent Time Stage School, the Haven House Children's Hospice, the Essex Women's Advisory Group, The Dream Factory and AA Dog Rescue. She is also an Executive Committee Member of the Royal Variety Charity. She has also presented the Soldering On Awards since 2016.

Michelle is also a regular campaigner for Ban Trophy Hunting, Acting For Others, the Mane Chance Horse Sanctuary, Autism's Got Talent and also supports the armed forces charities Blind Veterans UK, the RAF Benevolent Fund, Pathfinders and Nowzad Dogs.

=== Business ventures ===
In 1992, Michelle and two of her sisters set up a company called Trading Faces, of which Michelle is the company director, which provides celebrity after-dinner speakers for corporate events. The company's website also state that they also provide "film & video production facilities, multi-camera event coverage, CV & biography writing services, promotional & training films, film & TV commercials, press coverage, scriptwriting and product endorsement".

=== Radio ===
Michelle has been broadcasting a weekly chat show on Brentwood radio station Phoenix FM since October 2017.

=== Producing ===
In 2012, Michelle was executive producer of the film based on the Ray Cooney theatrical production Run for Your Wife.

== Personal life ==
Michelle has been married to cinematographer Graham Fowler since 1974. They have one daughter, born in 1989, who is also an actress.

In September 2015, Michelle was a guest on Big Brother's Bit on the Side and feared she could have been blinded after being hit on the back of the head with a champagne glass thrown by Farrah Abraham during a fight between Abraham and Aisleyne Horgan-Wallace. The show had to be taken off air early and the incident prompted a police investigation. Michelle was hospitalised and suffered from whiplash, concussion and balance issues. It was later reported Michelle wanted to 'press charges' against Abraham, although there is no mechanism for her to have done so in English law.

In 2016, Michelle said she suffers from tinnitus.

=== Honours ===
Michelle was appointed Member of the Order of the British Empire (MBE) in the 2010 Birthday Honours for her services to charity. She was also made a Dame of the Sovereign Hospitaller Order of St John of Jerusalem Knights of Malta in 2012.

== Filmography ==
=== Film ===
Year	Title	Role	Notes
1969	The Haunted House of Horror	Party Guest	Uncredited
1972	Virgin Witch	Betty	
1974	Poor Billy Render	Carol	
1975	Alfie Darling	Bird	
1975	En la cresta de la ola	Teresa	
1976	The Likely Lads	Glenys	
1976	Queen Kong	Crew Girl	
1977	The Sentinel	Girl on TV	
1977	Spectre	Maid	
1978	The Greek Tycoon	Nico's Girlfriend	
1980	Sweet William	Girl at airport	
1980	George and Mildred	Bishop's Second Girl	
1981	Priest of Love	Millie	
1985	The Service Call	Miss Grimshaw	
1999	The Colour of Funny	Peggy Lynch	
2012	Run for Your Wife	Tourist	Cameo
2013	The Callback Queen	Deborah Whitton	
2014	C.O.O.L.I.O.: Time Travel Gangster	Mrs. Aznavour	
2015	Silent Hours	Mary Woodward	
2016	No Reasons	Dr. Victoria Spencer	
2017	Rise of the Footsoldier 3: The Pat Tate Story	Susan Daley	
2017	Grimaldi: The Funniest Man in the World	Mary	
2020	The Document: On the Run	Nicole Robinson	
2021	A Suburban Fairytale	Mother Creedon	
2024	Bermondsey Tales: Fall of the Roman Empire	Rosemary Hatfield	
2025	Finding My Voice	Suz	
2025	Borley Rectory: The Awakening	Florence	

=== Television ===
Year	Title	Role	Notes
1968	Dixon of Dock Green	Unknown	uncredited
1970	Softly, Softly: Task Force	Reen	Episode: "Safe in the Streets?"
1971	Softly, Softly: Task Force	Rae	Episode: "The Floater"
1973	Softly, Softly: Task Force	Wanda Harris	Episode: "The Loudmouth"
1974	Whatever Happened to the Likely Lads?	Madelyn	Episode: "The Ant and the Grasshopper"
1974	Sporting Scenes	Girl	Episode: "A Drink Out of the Bottle"
1974	If There Weren't Any Blacks You'd Have to Invent Them	Nurse	TV film
1975	World of Laughter	Various	Episode: 2.6
1976	The Two Ronnies	Newspaper Hawker	Episode: "The Phantom Raspberry Blower of Old London Town"
1976	The Two Ronnies	Hughes	Episode: 5.6
1976	Space: 1999	Barbara	Episode: "The Taybor"
1977	The Dick Emery Show	Various	Episode: 16.6
1977	The Goodies	Nurse	Episode: "Rock Goodies"
1978	The Two Ronnies	Various	Episode: 6.8
1978	Come Back Mrs. Noah	The Maid	Episode: "The Housing Problem"
1978	The Professionals	Jo	Episode: "Hunter/Hunted"
1979	The Two Ronnies	Miss Featherstone	Episode: 7.5
1979–1980	The Dawson Watch	Sandra	7 Episodes
1980	Minder	Sarah Jane	Episode: "Don't Tell Them Willie Boy Was Here"
1980	Fancy Wanders	The Reporter	3 Episodes
1980	The Two Ronnies	State Policewoman	Episode: "The Worm That Turned"
1981	Cannon and Ball	Girl in Saloon Bar	Episode: 3.3
1981	Kelly Monteith	Girl at Gym	Episode: 3.3
1982	Don't Rock the Boat	Janet	Episode: "Combat Fatigue"
1982–1992	'Allo 'Allo!	Yvette Carte-Blanche	All 85 Episodes
1983	The Professionals	Tina	Episode: "The Untouchables"
1983	Are You Being Served?	C.B. Voice	Episode: "Calling All Customers"
1984	The Last Days of Pompeii	Priestess of Isis	Episode: "Part 2"
1984	Cannon and Ball	Maid Marian	Episode: 6.3
1985	The Little and Large Show	Various	Episode: 5.4
1985	Are You Being Served?	French Actress	Episode: "The Night Club"
1985	The Kenny Everett Television Show	Betty	3 Episodes
1986	Bobby Davro on the Box	Various	Episode: 1.1
1986	Two's Company	Elisabeth	TV film
1992–1997	Noel's House Party	Noel's Neighbour	15 episodes
1997	Gayle's World	Vicki	2 Episodes
1998	Lenny Goes to Town	Various	Episode: "Brighton"
2006	All in the Game	Emma	TV film
2007	The Return of 'Allo 'Allo!	Yvette Carte-Blanche	TV film
2007–2009	Emmerdale	Patricia Foster	4 Episodes
2007	Hotel Babylon	Barmaid	Episode: "Children in Need Special"
2010	Resentment	Amanda Newman	TV film
2011	Doctors	Penny Lester	Episode: "Whip Hand"
2012	The Mario Rosenstock Show	Sally O'Brien	Episode: 1.1
2015	Too Close for Comfort	Catherine	Episode: 1.4
2017	The Keith & Paddy Picture Show	Chambermaid	Episode: "Ghostbusters"
2020–2025	Barmy Dale	Angie Edwards	6 Episodes
2023	EastEnders	Jo Cotton	recurring
2024	Whitstable Pearl	Patti	Episode: "Prisoners of the Past"

=== Reality television ===
Year	Title	Role	Notes
2008	Celebrity Masterchef	Herself	Participant/Contestant
2012, 2013, 2014, 2015	Big Brother's Bit On The Side	Herself	7 Episodes
2014	I'm a Celebrity...Get Me Out of Here!	Herself	21 episodes
2018	Costa Del Celebrity	Herself	4 episodes

== Theatre ==
- 1969 – Play It Again Sam – Go-Go Girl – West End – Joseph Hardy
- 1985 – Doctor in The House – Vera – National Tour – Paul Elliott
- 1986/87 – 'Allo 'Allo – Yvette Carte-Blanche – West End – Peter Farago
- 1987/88 – 'Allo 'Allo – Yvette Carte-Blanche – International Tour – Peter Farago
- 1993/94 – Don't Dress for Dinner – Jacqueline – National Tour – Peter Farago
- 1995 – Don't Dress for Dinner – Jacqueline – National Tour – Peter Farago
- 1996 – Dracula – Mina – National Tour – Alan Cohen
- 1996/97 – 'Allo 'Allo – Yvette Carte-Blanche – National Tour – Peter Farago
- 1998 – Don't Dress for Dinner – Jacqueline – National Tour – Ian Dickens
- 1998 – Women of a Certain Age – Renee – National Tour – David Simmons
- 1999 – Beauty and the Beast – Bathsheba – Landmark Theatre, Ilfracombe – Steve Shappelle
- 2000 – Round and Round the Garden – Ruth – National Tour – Ian Dickens
- 2001 – Table Manners – Ruth – National Tour – Ian Dickens
- 2001 – Business Affairs – Hilda Bigley – National Tour – John B. Hobbs
- 2001 – Annie – Miss Hannigan – Theatre Royal, Lincoln – Chris Colby
- 2002 – The Tart and the Vicar's Wife – Glenda Parry – Theatre Royal, Lincoln – Chris Colby
- 2002/03 – Don't Dress for Dinner – Jacqueline – International Tour – Ian Dickens
- 2004 – Out of Order – Pamela Willey – National Tour – Ian Dickens
- 2004 – Reflections – Narrator – Hazlitt Theatre, Maidstone
- 2005 – Don't Dress for Dinner – Jacqueline – Overseas Tour – Chris Moreno
- 2005 – Bedside Manners – Sally – Overseas Tour – Chris Moreno
- 2005 – Annie – Miss Hannigan – Marlowe Theatre, Canterbury – Eric Potts
- 2005 – Salads Days – Lady Raeburn & Asphynxia – National Tour – Matthew Townshend
- 2005 – Stepping Out – Maxine – Theatre Royal, Lincoln – Chris Colby
- 2006 – Funny Money – Betty – UK Tour – Giles Watling & Ian Dickens
- 2006 – Salad Days – Lady Raeburn & Asphynxia – National Tour – Matthew Townshend
- 2006 – Audacity – Gillian – Lyceum Theatre, Crewe – Jay Marcus
- 2007 – Double Vision – Dawn & Donna – Lyceum Theatre, Crewe – Jay Marcus
- 2007 – Annie – Miss Hannigan – Gordon Craig Theatre, Stevenage – Scott St. Martin
- 2008 – Lock Up Your Daughters – Mrs. Squeezum – Hoxne – Matthew Townshend
- 2008/09 – 'Allo 'Allo – Yvette Carte-Blanche – National Tour – James Robert Carson
- 2009 – The Best Little Whorehouse in Texas – Mona Stangley – New Theatre, Hull – Jonathan Parker
- 2010 – Wife Begins at Forty – Linda Harper – Grand Theatre, Blackpool – Brian Godfrey
- 2010 – Stop Dreamin' – Vi Collins – UK Tour – Ray Cooney
- 2011 – Stop Dreamin' – Vi Collins – UK Tour – Ray Cooney
- 2012 – That's Love – Sarah Daniels – UK Tour – Ron Aldridge
- 2012 – Wife Begins at Forty – Linda Harper – Yvonne Arnaud Theatre, Guildford – Ray Cooney
- 2014 – The Importance of Being Earnest – Lady Bracknell – McGrigor Hall, Frinton – Edward Max
- 2014 – Hello Norma Jeane – Lynnie – Kings Head Theatre, London – Matthew Gould
- 2019 – Hormonal Housewives – Vicki – UK Tour – Julie Combe
- 2021 – Hello Norma Jeane – Lynnie – Southwold Arts Centre, Southwold – Dylan Costello
- 2021 – Dirty Dusting – Olive – UK Tour – Ed Waugh
- 2022 – Dirty Dusting – Olive – UK Tour – Ed Waugh
- 2022 – The Wizard of Oz – Glinda the Good – UK Tour – Paul Boyd

=== Pantomime ===
- 1983 – Snow White – Wicked Red Queen – Opera House, Cork
- 1988 – Snow White – Wicked Queen – The Alexandra House, Birmingham
- 1991 – Aladdin – Genie – The New Theatre, Cardiff
- 1992 – Aladdin – Genie – Lyceum Theatre, Sheffield
- 1993 – Jack and the Beanstalk – Fairy – The Grand Theatre, Swansea
- 1994 – Aladdin – Genie – Theatre Royal, Plymouth
- 1996 – Mother Goose – Fairy – Hippodrome, Birmingham
- 1997 – Jack and the Beanstalk – Fairy – Churchill Theatre, Bromley
- 1999 – Aladdin – Genie – The Grand Theatre, Swansea
- 2000 – Snow White – Wicked Queen – Alban Arena, St. Albans
- 2001 – Snow White – Wicked Queen – Broadway Theatre, Lewisham
- 2002 – Aladdin – Aladdin – Civic Hall, Bedworth
- 2003 – Peter Pan – Herrietta & Mrs Darling – New Theatre, Hull
- 2004 – Cinderella – Lady Cruella – New Theatre, North Wales Theatre, Llandudno
- 2005 – Sleeping Beauty – Fairy Moan – Broadway Theatre, Peterborough
- 2006 – Sleeping Beauty – Lilac Fairy – Plaza Theatre, Stockport
- 2007 – Robin Hood – The Enchantress – Connaught Theatre, Worthing
- 2008 – Snow White – Wicked Queen – New Theatre Hull
- 2009 – Snow White – Wicked Queen – Playhouse, Weston-Super-Mare
- 2010 – Sleeping Beauty – Carabosse – Palace Theatre, Newark
- 2011 – Sleeping Beauty – Carabosse – Harlequin Theatre, Redhill
- 2012 – Beauty and the Beast – Silver Enchantress – Hexagon Theatre, Reading
- 2013 – Sleeping Beauty – Lilac Fairy – Middlesbrough Theatre
- 2015 – Sleeping Beauty – Malicious (the evil fairy) – Lincoln Theatre Royal
- 2016 – Jack and the Beanstalk – Fairy Pea Pod – King's Theatre, Portsmouth
- 2017 – Aladdin – Slave of the Ring – Northwich Memorial Court, Cheshire
- 2018 – Sleeping Beauty – Carabosse – Castleford Civic Centre
- 2019 – Snow White – Wicked Queen – Grand Opera House, York
- 2021 – Cinderella – Fairy Fabulous – Grimsby Auditorium
- 2022 – Sleeping Beauty – Carabosse – Playhouse, Weston-Super-Mare
- 2023 – Sleeping Beauty – Wicked Fairy – Regent Theatre, Ipswich
- 2025 – Sleeping Beauty – Carabosse – Malthouse Theatre, Canterbury
