= Ricky Grover =

English actor and comedian (born 1961)

Ricky Grover (born 24 December 1961) is an English actor and comedian. He is best known for his role in EastEnders as Andrew Cotton as well as voicing Yangus in the Dragon Quest series.

== Early life ==
Grover was born in West Ham, East London in 24 December 1961. His mother was a hairdresser.

Grover became a ladies' hairdresser and a boxer. He then became a stand-up comedian, actor and occasional television presenter. Grover is dyslexic and could not read or write until his early thirties.

== Acting career ==
Grover has appeared in television programmes including Red Dwarf, Fist of Fun, 'Orrible, The 11 O'Clock Show, Honky Sausages and Black Books. He also provided the voice acting for the character of Yangus in the English language version of the PlayStation 2 game Dragon Quest VIII.

Grover's 1996 short film Punch won the Silver Bear Award at the Berlin International Film Festival.

In 1998, Grover featured in the music video for the England song Vindaloo by "Fat Les".

In 2000, Grover won the Best Actor award at the Brest European Short Film Festival for his performance in Hungry (1998). One of his most regular characters is "Bulla", a violent offender who originally featured on The 11 O'Clock Show and was interviewed by Michael Parkinson. He had a guest appearance in Top Buzzer. In 2011 he starred and co-wrote the feature-length film Big Fat Gypsy Gangster with his wife, Maria Grover.

Grover has appeared in adverts for Virgin Mobile and Beagle Street Insurance.

Since July 2009, Grover has played the part of Matron Hilary Loftus in the BAFTA award-winning BBC Four medical 'docu-sitcom' Getting On, directed by Peter Capaldi. He had a role in the vampire film Dead Cert and in the horror drama Tony, which was released in UK cinemas on 5 February 2010.

Grover also had a role in an episode of Not Going Out in 2011, playing Larry Stubbs, a drug-dealing butcher.

Grover reprised the role of Yangus in the 2015 videogame Dragon Quest Heroes: The World Tree's Woe and the Blight Below.

== Presenting career ==
In 2006, Grover presented the documentary F*** Off I'm Fat as part of BBC Three's first "Body Image" season. In 2007, he presented a peak-time Tonight With Trevor McDonald report on obesity and a BBC Two episode of Grandad's Back in Business in which he mentored two stand-up comedians.

== Writing ==
From July 2003, Grover wrote a column, "Raging Bulla", for the monthly magazine Loaded until its final issue in 2015.

== Filmography ==
=== Film and TV ===
- Fist of Fun (1995)
- Punch (1996)
- Bring Me the Head of Mavis Davis (1997)
- Hungry (1998)
- Red Dwarf (1999), as Baxter
- Love, Honour and Obey (2000)
- The 11 O'Clock Show (2000), as Bulla
- Black Books (2002), as Danny Spudge
- Revolver (2005)
- Cargo (2006)
- Tony (2009)
- Getting On (2009–2012)
- Big Fat Gypsy Gangster (2010)
- Not Going Out (2011)
- EastEnders (2011–12)
- Being Human (2013)
- Citizen Khan (2016)
- Zapped (2016–2017)
- Porridge (2016–2017)
- This Way Up (2019)
- After Life (2021)
- Vengeance Is Mine (2021)
- The Outlaws (2024)

=== Video game roles ===
- Dragon Quest VIII: Journey of the Cursed King – Yangus
- Dragon Quest Heroes: The World Tree's Woe and the Blight Below - Yangus

== Books ==
- Sit-Down Comedy (contributor to anthology, ed Malcolm Hardee & John Fleming), Ebury Press/Random House, 2003. ISBN 0-09-188924-3.
