= Romford Film Festival =

Film festival

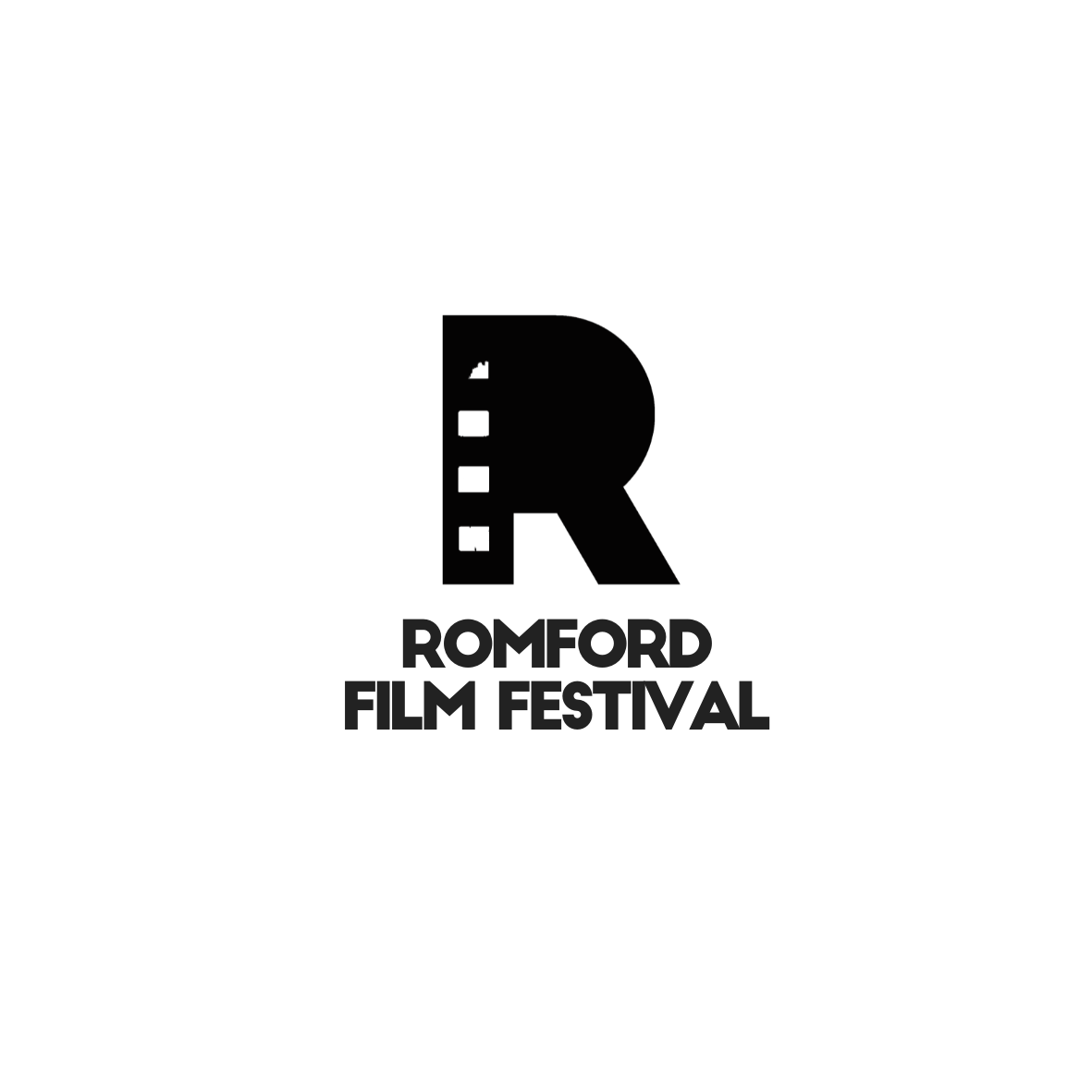
- Location: Romford, London, England
- Founded: 2017; 9 years ago
- Founded by: Spencer Hawken
- Most recent: May 24–28, 2024
- Awards: 20
- Language: English
- Website: romfordfilmfestival.com

The Romford Film Festival is an independent film festival founded in 2017 by festival director Spencer Hawken. The festival takes place annually in Romford, United Kingdom and is hosted at Premiere Cinemas inside The Mercury Mall.

The festival celebrates the showcasing of the best independent British and International films. The festival provides a platform for established and emerging filmmakers in showcasing their work, discover new talent, and network with industry professionals. The festival also gives opportunities for audiences to engage with filmmakers through live Q&A's. The festival includes screenings from first-time filmmakers to some of the most established names on the independent film circuit with features, short films, music videos, documentary films and Animation. The festival recognises the achievements of filmmakers through awards in multiple categories.

The festival has attracted a growing audience of filmmakers and industry professionals over the years including Joan Collins, Caroline Munro, Pauline Peart, Larry Lamb and Marc Bannerman.

== History ==
In 2020, the 4th festival was held from 13 to 18 August 2020 and was the first physical festival in the UK post COVID-19 outbreak.

In 2021, the Romford Film Festival team was invited to attend Tashkent Film Festival where they were the first UK film delegation to attend.

In 2022, the 6th festival was held from 19 to 25 May 2022 hosting over 180 films. The festival screened Becontree 100 years a film about the first ever council estate in the UK.

In 2023, the 7th festival was held from 24 to 30 May 2023 and hosted 160 films. The opening night at the festival featured the screening of Warner Brothers adventure movie, "Jim Button and the Wild 13" a sequel to original book Jim Button and Luke the Engine Driver from the creators of The NeverEnding Story. Other notable films included the clacton-made revenge thriller "Morris Men," the UK premiere of the compelling drama "Out and About," and a trio of important and diverse films by acclaimed Japanese filmmaker Kenich Ugana. Caroline Munro known for the bond girl Naomi in the 1977 film The Spy Who Loved Me. Holby City's Sarah-Jane Potts and Hammer horror star Pauline Peart attend the festival.

In 2024, the 8th festival took place between 24–28 May 2024.

== Awards ==
The Romford Film Festival recognises the achievements of filmmakers in the following awards.

- Best Feature Film
- Best British Film
- Best Documentary Film
- Best Short Film
- Best Foreign Language Film
- Best Local Film (Previously Best Havering Film)
- Best Animation
- Best No or Low Budget Film
- Best Director
- Best Screenplay
- Best Actor
- Best Actress
- Best Supporting Actor
- Best Supporting Actress
- Best Cinematography
- Best Editing
- Best Score
- Lifetime Achievement
- The Jury Prize
- Commendations
- Audience Choice

Key
Award Nomination
Award winner

2018 Season Nominations & Award Winners
Award	Nominee / Award Winner
Best Feature Film	Redwood
Best Feature Film	A Landscape of Lies
Best Feature Film	Alone
Best Feature Film	Blue
Best Feature Film	Crowhurst
Best Feature Film	Dark Beacon
Best Feature Film	Drawing Home
Best Feature Film	Welcome To Essex
Best Feature Film	Your Move
Best Documentary Film	Belonging: The Truth Behind The Headlines
Best Documentary Film	America Kum
Best Documentary Film	Cube Libre?
Best Documentary Film	Flin Flon
Best Documentary Film	Full Circle
Best Documentary Film	The Marvin Case
Best Documentary Film	The Ultimate Rally
Best Documentary Film	Tonic of the Sea
Best Documentary Film	Word From A Gamer
Best Short Film	Calamity
Best Short Film	43 Quintillion
Best Short Film	Chimera
Best Short Film	Disconnected
Best Short Film	Kamatayan
Best Short Film	Reclamation
Best Short Film	Someday
Best Short Film	Split Costs
Best Short Film	Te Makutu
Best Short Film	The Interrogation of Olivia Donovan
Best Short Film	The Tolls
Best Short Film	Tonic of the Sea
Best Havering Film	Mumatar
Best Havering Film	Alone
Best Havering Film	Disconnected
Best Havering Film	Katrina
Best Havering Film	Mind Fuck
Best Havering Film	Visions
Best Havering Film	Wood
Best Animation	Let Them Stand
Best Animation	Tour
Best Animation	Wood
Best Director	Luke Goss (Your Move)
Best Director	Corrie Greenop (Dark Beacon)
Best Director	Gabriela Ledesma (Blue)
Best Director	Jonathan Zsofi (Te Makutu)
Best Director	Shane Ryan (Paper Kids)
Best Director	Simon Rumley (Fashionista)
Best Director	Steven Murphy (My Saviour)
Best Director	Tom Paton (Redwood)
Best Director	Tony Klinger (Full Circle)
Best Screenplay	Dark Beacon
Best Screenplay	Blue
Best Screenplay	Calamity
Best Screenplay	Reclamation
Best Screenplay	Since I Don't Have You
Best Screenplay	Split Costs
Best Screenplay	Te Makutu
Best Screenplay	The Guardians
Best Screenplay	Your Move
Best Actor	Francois Maquet (Calamity)
Best Actor	Danny Mindwinter (Landscape Of Lies)
Best Actor	James Hamer-Morton (My Bloody Banjo)
Best Actor	Juan Riedinger (Drawing Home)
Best Actor	Luke Goss (Your Move)
Best Actor	Mike Beckingham (Redwood)
Best Actor	Mu-Shaka Benson (Mei Anchol Ia)
Best Actor	Stephen Kerr (Son)
Best Actor	Warren Day (Alone)
Best Actress	Callie Schuttera (Blue)
Best Actress	Amanda Fuller (Fashionista)
Best Actress	April Pearson (Dark Beacon)
Best Actress	Bayley Freer (My Saviour)
Best Actress	Ingrid Heiderscheidt (Calamity)
Best Actress	Julie L. Mortenson (Drawing Home)
Best Actress	Sarah Hawkins (Roller Coaster)
Best Actress	Tatjana Nardone (Redwood)
Best Actress	Vanessa Emme (The Observer Effect)
Best Supporting Actor	Rutgar Hauer (Drawing Home)
Best Supporting Actor	Chris Santos (Someday)
Best Supporting Actor	David Whitney (The Guardians)
Best Supporting Actor	Eric Balfour (Fashionista)
Best Supporting Actor	Laurence Harvey (My Bloody Banjo)
Best Supporting Actor	Marc Zammit (Chimera)
Best Supporting Actor	Mark Bannerman (Landscape Of Lies)
Best Supporting Actor	Shaw Jones (Blue)
Best Supporting Actor	Wallace Shawn (Drawing Home)
Best Supporting Actress	Mela Hudson (Split Costs)
Best Supporting Actress	Amanda Wyss (It Happened Again Last Night)
Best Supporting Actress	Amy Loughton (Crowhurst)
Best Supporting Actress	Dani Thompson (My Bloody Banjo)
Best Supporting Actress	Debra Leigh-Taylor (Dogged)
Best Supporting Actress	Ellie Paskell (The Interrogations Of Olivia Donnovan)
Best Supporting Actress	Hattie Hayridge (The Guardians)
Best Supporting Actress	Kate Mulgrew (Drawing Home)
Best Supporting Actress	Lynne A. Rodgers
Best Supporting Actress	Rayanna Dibs (Alone)
Best Editing	Tonic of the Sea
Best Editing	Calamity
Best Editing	Crowhurst
Best Editing	Dark Beacon
Best Editing	Fashionista
Best Editing	Flin Flon
Best Editing	My Blood Banjo
Best Editing	Someday
Best Editing	Te Makutu
Life Time Achievement Award	Simon Rumley
Life Time Achievement Award	Tony Klinger

2019 Season Nominations & Award Winners
Award	Nominee / Award Winner
Best Feature Film	Safe Spaces
Best Feature Film	13 Graves
Best Feature Film	All Eyes On You
Best Feature Film	Beyond Fury
Best Feature Film	Black Site
Best Feature Film	I Love My Mum
Best Feature Film	Lie Low
Best Feature Film	Sugar Cube
Best Feature Film	The Guard Of Auschwitz
Best Documentary Film	The Little Count
Best Documentary Film	Island Road
Best Documentary Film	Karen Black on Acting
Best Documentary Film	King for a Day
Best Documentary Film	Millennium After The Millennium
Best Documentary Film	My Martian Dad
Best Documentary Film	National Anthem Girl
Best Documentary Film	The Doll House
Best Documentary Film	The Mentor
Best Short Film	Beautified
Best Short Film	An Unkind Word
Best Short Film	Epiphany
Best Short Film	From The Heart
Best Short Film	Hold Your Breath
Best Short Film	Ilford Lane
Best Short Film	Little Milo
Best Short Film	My Martian Dad
Best Short Film	Old Hearts Cafe
Best Short Film	The Goodbye
Best Short Film	This Island
Best Havering Film	The Guard Of Auschwitz
Best Havering Film	All In
Best Havering Film	Beautified
Best Havering Film	Epiphany
Best Havering Film	Gone
Best Havering Film	Human Cargo
Best Havering Film	Ilford Lane
Best Havering Film	Its Over
Best Havering Film	London Rampage
Best Havering Film	The Eliminator
Best Animation	Scars
Best Animation	A Face That Launched A Thousand Ships
Best Animation	BIWY
Best Director	Felix Maxim Eller (All Eyes On You)
Best Director	Alberto Sciamma (I Love My Mum)
Best Director	Daniel Schechter (Safe Space)
Best Director	Darren Ward (Beyond Fury)
Best Director	Dean Marriot (Stolen)
Best Director	Drago Lazetich (Little Milo)
Best Director	George Velez Junior (The Goodbye)
Best Director	John Langridge (13 Graves)
Best Director	Luke Jacobson (Sugar Cube)
Best Director	Tom Paton (Black Site)
Best Screenplay	Black Site
Best Screenplay	All Eyes on You
Best Screenplay	An Unkind Word
Best Screenplay	Beyond Fury
Best Screenplay	I Love My Mum
Best Screenplay	Safe Spaces
Best Screenplay	Sugar Cube
Best Screenplay	The Eliminator
Best Screenplay	The Good Bye
Best Screenplay	Human Cargo
Best Actor	Kevin Leslie (13 Graves)
Best Actor	Eddie Linina (Stray Dog)
Best Actor	Ian Slade (Little Milo)
Best Actor	James Purefoy (Hold Your Breath)
Best Actor	Jannis Kuster (All Eyes On You)
Best Actor	Justin Long (Safe Spaces)
Best Actor	Matt Marasco (Sugar Cube)
Best Actor	Nick Roberts (Beyond Fury)
Best Actor	Shaun Medum (The Goodbye)
Best Actor	Tommy French (I Love My Mum)
Best Actress	Kierston Wareing (I Love My Mum)
Best Actress	Claudia Grace McKell (The Guard Of Auschwitz)
Best Actress	Danni Thompson (Beyond Fury)
Best Actress	Emily Haigh (Beautified)
Best Actress	Fernanda Diniz (Red Devil)
Best Actress	Fran Drescher (Safe Spaces)
Best Actress	Lina Driemel (All Eyes On You)
Best Actress	Samantha Schnitzler (Black Site)
Best Actress	Susan Penhaligon (An Unkind Word)
Best Actress	Terri Dwyer (13 Graves)
Best Supporting Actor	Giovanni Lombardo Radice (Beyond Fury)
Best Supporting Actor	Dan Van Husen (Beyond Fury)
Best Supporting Actor	Elvis Clausen (All Eyes On You)
Best Supporting Actor	Eneko Sanz (Stolen)
Best Supporting Actor	Frank Le Bouf (I Love My Mum)
Best Supporting Actor	Jim Liu (Little Milo)
Best Supporting Actor	Joe Paradavila (From The Heart)
Best Supporting Actor	Michael Mckell (13 Graves)
Best Supporting Actor	Richard Schiff (Safe Spaces)
Best Supporting Actor	Steven Barkoff (Red Devil)
Best Supporting Actress	Kate Berlant (Safe Spaces)
Best Supporting Actress	Alice Ryan (Human Cargo)
Best Supporting Actress	Alexis Martinez (Cyanide Love)
Best Supporting Actress	Bright Stauber (Stolen)
Best Supporting Actress	Chameli Meir (Ilford Lane)
Best Supporting Actress	Elina Saleh (Lie Low)
Best Supporting Actress	Sally George (The Guard Of Aushwitz)
Best Supporting Actress	Tatiana Kotsimos (Sugar Cube)
Best Supporting Actress	Tippy Elgar (Screw Loose)
Best Editing	Kharms
Best Editing	An Underground Affair
Best Editing	An Unkind Word
Best Editing	Cyandie Love
Best Editing	Epiphany
Best Editing	London Rampage
Best Editing	Safe Spaces
Best Editing	The Goodbye
Best Editing	The Lost Sheed
Best Editing	The Mentor
Life Time Achievement Award	Richard Stanley
Life Time Achievement Award	Simon Boswell
Special Commendation	Gone (Billy Holland)
Special Commendation	Beyond Fury (Darren Ward)
Special Commendation	London Rampage (Greg Burridge)
Special Commendation	My Name is Kozha

2020 Season Nominations & Award Winners
Award	Nominee / Award Winner
Best Feature Film	Shibil
Best Feature Film	Doctors Case
Best Feature Film	I Scream on the Beach
Best Feature Film	Killer Tattooist
Best Feature Film	Kings of Mulberry Street
Best Feature Film	Puppet Killer
Best Feature Film	The Duckpond
Best Documentary Film	High Flying Jade
Best Documentary Film	Butcher Baronet
Best Documentary Film	Chasing The Jeststream
Best Documentary Film	Everybody Flies
Best Documentary Film	Gift Of Hope
Best Documentary Film	Last Tour Of Duty
Best Documentary Film	Osprey
Best Documentary Film	Patagonia Triple Crown
Best Documentary Film	Reclaiming The Negative
Best Documentary Film	Ruth Weiss: The Beat Goddess
Best Short Film	Powerless
Best Short Film	Afterlife Bureau
Best Short Film	Cactus Boy
Best Short Film	Dinner With Mom
Best Short Film	Eugene Vs Humanity
Best Short Film	I’m listening
Best Short Film	New Woman
Best Short Film	One Track Mind
Best Short Film	Retrieval
Best Short Film	Unregistered
Best Local Film	Farside
Best Local Film	Black Mass
Best Local Film	Cactus Boy
Best Local Film	Just A Girl
Best Local Film	Killer Tattooist
Best Local Film	Little Love
Best Local Film	Next in Line
Best Local Film	Osprey
Best Director	Nikola Bozadzhiev (Shibil)
Best Director	Ben Griffin (Ji)
Best Director	Benjamin Noah (New Woman)
Best Director	Coz Greenop (Sweet Street)
Best Director	Daniel Harding (Dinner With Mum)
Best Director	Jimmy Kelly (Polybius)
Best Director	Nicole Pott (Powerless)
Best Director	Sami Mustonen (Marras)
Best Screenplay	I’m Listening
Best Screenplay	Afterlife Bureau
Best Screenplay	Cactus Boy
Best Screenplay	Conversations with a Cigarette
Best Screenplay	Duckpond
Best Screenplay	Honor Among Thieves
Best Screenplay	Marras
Best Screenplay	Next in Line
Best Screenplay	Powerless
Best Screenplay	Shibil
Best Actor	Colin James O’Gorman (Eugene Vs Humanity)
Best Actor	Adam Scott-Houghton (Next in line)
Best Actor	Colin Ford (Cactus Boy)
Best Actor	Henry Haggard (I’ll Be There)
Best Actor	James Cosmo (Off Grid)
Best Actor	Mahmut Gökgöz (Sycamore)
Best Actor	Panatyot Mustakerski (Shibil)
Best Actor	Shane Attwooll (Farside)
Best Actor	Tom Atkins (Polibius)
Best Actor	Yi-Wen Chen (A Trip With Mom)
Best Actress	Saara Runtti (Marras)
Best Actress	Ariadna Cabrol (Sweet Street)
Best Actress	Claudia Grace McKell (Just A Girl)
Best Actress	Dey Young (Fifty)
Best Actress	Jane Asher (One Track Mind)
Best Actress	Katie Marie Carter (Powerless)
Best Actress	Meryl Griffiths (Dinner With Mom)
Best Actress	Marjaana Maijala (I’m Listening)
Best Actress	Nika Burnet (Week With Rebecca)
Best Actress	Sacha Parkinson (Farside)
Best Supporting Actor	Victor Von Schirach (The Duckpond)
Best Supporting Actor	Bogomil Naidenov (Shibil)
Best Supporting Actor	Garden Peaston (The Afterlife Bureau)
Best Supporting Actor	Michael B Tabb (Honor Among Thieves)
Best Supporting Actor	Stephen T. Shore (Polybius)
Best Supporting Actor	Steve Hodgetts (Next in Line)
Best Supporting Actor	Steven Brand (In The Campfire Light)
Best Supporting Actor	William B Davis (The Doctors Case)
Best Supporting Actress	Georgie Flores (Cactus Boy)
Best Supporting Actress	Ashley Williams (Retrieval)
Best Supporting Actress	Denise Crosby (The Doctors Case)
Best Supporting Actress	Gergana Hristova (Shibil)
Best Supporting Actress	Jennifer Kelly (Polytbius)
Best Supporting Actress	Monika Hristova (Shibil)
Best Supporting Actress	Robyn Coffin (Town Hall)
Best Supporting Actress	Yiin-Shang Liou (A Trip With Mom)
Best Cinematography	Marras
Best Cinematography	Balaika
Best Cinematography	Cactus Boy
Best Cinematography	House Red
Best Cinematography	Ji
Best Cinematography	New Woman
Best Cinematography	Shibil
Best Cinematography	Week With Rebecca
Best Score	Shibil
Best Score	A Trip With Mom
Best Score	Cactus Boy
Best Score	Fifty
Best Score	Lavender
Best Score	Marras
Best Score	New Woman
Best Score	Reclaiming The Negative
Jury Prize	Choker
Jury Prize	Paper House
Jury Prize	Seconds Out
Jury Prize	Parka
Jury Prize	Anne

2021 Season Nominations & Award Winners
Award	Nominee / Award Winner
Best Feature Film	Maquis
Best Feature Film	Dogwood
Best Feature Film	I Am Vengeance: Retaliation
Best Feature Film	I'm An Electric Lampshade
Best Feature Film	Last Call
Best Feature Film	Mr Johnson
Best Feature Film	The Blue Tooth Virgin
Best Feature Film	The Stars My Destination
Best Documentary Film	Who Is James Payton
Best Documentary Film	More Than Miyagi
Best Documentary Film	Hello Sunshine
Best Documentary Film	Mujereando: The Lament Of A Goddess
Best Documentary Film	Rom Boys: 40 Years Of Rad
Best Documentary Film	Safer in Silence
Best Documentary Film	The Horror Crowd
Best Documentary Film	The Most Dangerous Man in Europe
Best Short Film	The Gesture and the Word
Best Short Film	A New Leash On Life
Best Short Film	Autumn Never Dies
Best Short Film	Lunch Hour with the President
Best Short Film	Officer Down
Best Short Film	Queen Luck
Best Short Film	The Snow Maze
Best Short Film	The Two Of Us at the Edge of the World
Best Local Film	Rom Boys: 40 Years Of Rad
Best Local Film	Esther
Best Local Film	Homeward Bound
Best Local Film	On My Own
Best Local Film	Stalling It
Best Local Film	Stay Over
Best Local Film	The Chain
Best Local Film	The Ghosts of Borley Rectory
Best Local Film	The Suit Weareth The Man
Best Local Film	77 seconds
Best Director	Helen Alexis Yonov (The Gesture and the Word)
Best Director	Caroline Ward & Jemma Moore (Stalling It)
Best Director	Gavin Michael Booth (Last Call)
Best Director	Joshua Benson (Queen Luck)
Best Director	Pamela Perrine (Lunch Hour with the President)
Best Director	Russell Brown (The Blue Tooth Virgin)
Best Director	Sam Cadman (The Snow Maze)
Best Screenplay	The Blue Tooth Virgin
Best Screenplay	Lunch House with the President
Best Screenplay	Maquis
Best Screenplay	On My Own
Best Screenplay	Queen Luck
Best Screenplay	Ruby Days
Best Screenplay	The Gesture and the word
Best Actor	Lee Hunter (On My Own)
Best Actor	Anthony Quinlan (Asphyxiate)
Best Actor	Anthony Reynolds (Lunch House with the President)
Best Actor	Austin Peck (The Blue Tooth Virgin)
Best Actor	James Michael Tyler (The Gesture and the Word)
Best Actor	Martin Delaney (Officer Down)
Best Actor	Neil Hobbs (Its Going To Be Okay)
Best Actor	Toby Wynn-Davis (The Ghosts Of Borley Rectory)
Best Actress	Christina Spruell (Queen Luck)
Best Actress	Ellie Ekers (Rottweiler)
Best Actress	Jemma Moore (Stalling It)
Best Actress	Michaela Longden (Asphyxiate)
Best Actress	Michaela McManus (Monsters and Muses)
Best Actress	Rebekah Stein (Queen Luck)
Best Actress	Sarah Booth (Last Call)
Best Actress	Sophie McBean
Best Supporting Actor	Josef Altin (Officer Down)
Best Supporting Actor	Ben Turner (Officer Down)
Best Supporting Actor	Bryce Johnson (The Blue Tooth Virgin)
Best Supporting Actor	Craig Conway (Eulogy)
Best Supporting Actor	Lukas Barnett (Calf Rope)
Best Supporting Actor	Paul Dooley (The Gesture and the Word)
Best Supporting Actor	Renato Gianoli (Living Unscathed)
Best Supporting Actor	Vinnie Jones (I Am Vengeance: Retaliation)
Best Supporting Actress	Caroline Ward (Stalling It)
Best Supporting Actress	Alejandra Gollas (Love Is Not Love)
Best Supporting Actress	Erika Christensen (Proxy)
Best Supporting Actress	Fatima Plazas (Maquis)
Best Supporting Actress	Linda Zhu (Handscape)
Best Supporting Actress	Michelle Mitchenor (August Us)
Best Supporting Actress	Nicole La Librete (The Gesture and the Word)
Best Supporting Actress	Toyah Willcox (The Ghosts of Borley Rectory)
Best Cinematography	The Snow Maze
Best Cinematography	Maquis
Best Cinematography	Mr. Johnson
Best Cinematography	Officer Down
Best Cinematography	Robert The Robot
Best Cinematography	The Gesture and the Word
Best Cinematography	The Smuggler
Best Cinematography	Queen Luck
Best Score	The Smuggler
Best Score	Handscape
Best Score	Mujereando: The Lament Of A Goddess
Best Score	Robert The Robot
Best Score	Special Delivery
Best Score	The Gesture and the Word
Best Score	The Snow Maze
Best Score	The Two Of Us at the Edge of the World
Jury Prize	A New Leash On Life
Jury Prize	Autumn Never Dies
Jury Prize	Blud
Jury Prize	I am Vengence: Retaliation
Jury Prize	My Darling Christopher
Jury Prize	On My Own
Jury Prize	Proxy
Jury Prize	Single Line Theory
Jury Prize	The Ghosts of Borley Rectory
Jury Prize	The Most Dangerous Man in Europe
Jury Prize	The Two Of Us at the Edge of the World
Audience Choice	Best Feature Film – Election Night
Audience Choice	Best Short Film – Asphyxiate
Audience Choice	Best Documentary – Who Is James Payton

2022 Season Nominations & Award Winners
Award	Nominee / Award Winner
Best Feature Film	Sweet Disaster
Best Feature Film	Daddy's Girl
Best Feature Film	New Material
Best Feature Film	Pretty Boy
Best Feature Film	The Lady
Best Feature Film	The Swap
Best Feature Film	Steps
Best Documentary Film	Fraser Syndrome & Me
Best Documentary Film	A Better Life
Best Documentary Film	Becontree: 100 Years On
Best Documentary Film	Cinema Now
Best Documentary Film	Cry of the Forests
Best Documentary Film	Micropubs – The New Local
Best Documentary Film	One last Spin
Best Documentary Film	The Tears of Bea Smit
Best Short Film	The Magician
Best Short Film	Colossus
Best Short Film	Divertimento
Best Short Film	Human Trash
Best Short Film	Old Windows
Best Short Film	The Other One
Best Short Film	Time & Tide
Best Short Film	Wool
Best Foreign Language Film	Human Trash
Best Foreign Language Film	Beats
Best Foreign Language Film	Dana
Best Foreign Language Film	Moskover Forever
Best Foreign Language Film	Swamp
Best Foreign Language Film	Sweet Disaster
Best Foreign Language Film	The Lady
Best Foreign Language Film	The Other One
Best Local Film	Visitor
Best Local Film	Becontree: 100 Years On
Best Local Film	Cinema Now
Best Local Film	Collier Row Then And Now
Best Local Film	Fortina 2
Best Local Film	In Two Minds
Best Local Film	My London Lullaby
Best Local Film	See What She Did
Best Animation	Live.
Best Animation	Claws
Best Animation	Crappy Christmas
Best Animation	Family Tree
Best Animation	Fortina 2
Best Director	Keyvan Sheikhalishahi (Divertimeto)
Best Director	Julian Richards (Daddy's Girl)
Best Director	Kenichi Ugana (The Empty Flowerpot)
Best Director	Laura Lehmus (Sweet Disaster)
Best Director	Lukas Baier (The Other One)
Best Director	Marcel Walz (Pretty Boy)
Best Director	Micky Cornwell (Court Number 5)
Best Screenplay	Old Windows
Best Screenplay	Human Trash
Best Screenplay	New Material
Best Screenplay	Pretty Boy
Best Screenplay	Sweet Disaster
Best Screenplay	The Empty Flowerpot
Best Screenplay	The Lady
Best Screenplay	The Other One
Best Actor	Larry Lamb (Old Windows)
Best Actor	Arlos Acrrekootxea (Human Trash)
Best Actor	Costas Mandylor (Daddy's Girl)
Best Actor	Eddy Munoz (Consequences)
Best Actor	Kazuki Abe (The Empty Flower Pot)
Best Actor	Paul Bradley (The man at the bottom of the Garden)
Best Actor	Sebastian Somma (The Lady)
Best Actor	Sebastian Edtbauer (The Other One)
Best Actress	Tiggy Bayley (Tildypops)
Best Actress	Friederike Kempter (Sweet Disaster)
Best Actress	Jamie Windstone (Court Number 5)
Best Actress	Laura Bayston (Old Windows)
Best Actress	Nera Elizalde (Hikikomori)
Best Actress	Paula Gallego (Accomplices)
Best Actress	Sarah-Jane Potts (The Magician)
Best Actress	Vey Straker (Wool)
Best Supporting Actor	Joey Rasdien (New Material)
Best Supporting Actor	Bambadjan Bamda (Wasted Seed)
Best Supporting Actor	Bob Barrett (The Magican)
Best Supporting Actor	Jason Segade (Wool)
Best Supporting Actor	Jesse Moss (Daddy's Girl)
Best Supporting Actor	John Neisler (Colossus)
Best Supporting Actor	Julian Lehr (Beats)
Best Supporting Actor	Matthew Ventre (Dinner for Two)
Best Supporting Actress	Lena Urzendowsky (Sweet Disaster)
Best Supporting Actress	Britt McKillip (Daddy's Girl)
Best Supporting Actress	Desiree Noferini (The Lady)
Best Supporting Actress	Giulia Goldammer (Beats)
Best Supporting Actress	Heather Grace Hancock (Pretty Boy)
Best Supporting Actress	Julia Heinze (The Other One)
Best Supporting Actress	Natalie Martins (Shear)
Best Supporting Actress	Sammy Winward (Lead Belly)
Best Cinematography	Sweet Disaster
Best Cinematography	Divertimento
Best Cinematography	Pretty Boy
Best Cinematography	Steps
Best Cinematography	The Empty Flowerpot
Best Cinematography	The Magican
Best Cinematography	The Other One
Best Cinematography	Old Windows
Best Score	The Other One
Best Score	Divertimento
Best Score	Human Trash
Best Score	Moskover Forever
Best Score	Pretty Boy
Best Score	Sweet Disaster
Best Score	You Might Get Lost
Commendations	Anonymous
Commendations	Dana
Commendations	My London Lullaby
Commendations	Pretty Boy
Commendations	The Empty Flower Pot
Commendations	Wool

2023 Season Nominations & Award Winners
Award	Nominee / Award Winner
Best Feature Film	Out and About
Best Feature Film	Coyote
Best Feature Film	Good Guy with a Gun
Best Feature Film	Publish or Perish
Best Feature Film	The Wife and her House Husband
Best Feature Film	Walking Against the Rain
Best Documentary Film	Danny's Red Box
Best Documentary Film	And Outside Life Goes On
Best Documentary Film	Drawn To War
Best Documentary Film	Langford Tales
Best Documentary Film	Morning Without Evening
Best Documentary Film	Ray of Hope HAWFC – The Gym of Champions
Best Documentary Film	The Stevie Project
Best Documentary Film	Queen of Hearts
Best Short Film	The Magic World of Miracles
Best Short Film	Care
Best Short Film	Five Thousand Six Hundred Ninety-Seven Pounds
Best Short Film	My Dear Aunt Sally
Best Short Film	Roises Unicorn Delight
Best Short Film	Sensibility
Best Short Film	Under The Influence
Best Short Film	Wanderland
Best Short Film	Wild Angel
Best Foreign Language Film	A Butterfly's Heart
Best Foreign Language Film	Beloc The Blind
Best Foreign Language Film	Broken Wings
Best Foreign Language Film	Denali
Best Foreign Language Film	Left of Chopin
Best Foreign Language Film	Moja
Best Foreign Language Film	No Kidding
Best Foreign Language Film	Rolling Marbles
Best Foreign Language Film	The online Shop
Best Local Film	Black and White Duppy
Best Local Film	Mothers and Daughters
Best Local Film	Playing Away
Best Local Film	Split Check
Best Local Film	Walking Against The Rain
Best Animation	Triskelion
Best Animation	Fig Leaves
Best Animation	Morning Without Evening
Best No or Low Budget Film	A Touch of Vengeance
Best No or Low Budget Film	Claudia
Best No or Low Budget Film	Danny's Red Box
Best No or Low Budget Film	Delirum Tremens
Best No or Low Budget Film	Encore
Best No or Low Budget Film	Split Check
Best Director	Peter Callahan (Out and About)
Best Director	David Liban (Publish or Perish)
Best Director	Dustin Curtis Murphy (Coyote)
Best Director	John Mossman (Good Guy with a Gun)
Best Director	Nicole Sarah Fry (Desires and delusions)
Best Director	Simon Smith (Murmur)
Best Director	Tom Procida (My Dear Aunt Sally)
Best Screenplay	Little Mary (Duncan Paveling)
Best Screenplay	Everything Is Out To Get Me (Dustin Curtis Murphy)
Best Screenplay	Left of Chopin (Sayoko Kitamura and Yoshino Takemoto)
Best Screenplay	Out and About (Peter Callahan)
Best Screenplay	Pig Killer (Chad Ferrin)
Best Screenplay	Publish or Perish (David Liban)
Best Screenplay	When The Clapping Stops (Sam Briggs)
Best Actor	Ralph Ineson (Waving)
Best Actor	Alfie Stewart (Monico Perseus)
Best Actor	Brody Stowers (My Dear Aunt Sally)
Best Actor	Jake Busey (Pig Killer)
Best Actor	Leigh Gill (The Fifth Generation)
Best Actor	Michael Begley (Care)
Best Actor	Mindaugas Balabonas (A Butterfly's Heart)
Best Actor	Reece Douglas (Walking Against the Rain)
Best Actress	Becky Lindsay (Burnt Toast and Cigarettes)
Best Actress	Ailish Symons (Coyote)
Best Actress	Bronaugh Waugh (Murmur)
Best Actress	Claire Louise Frost (Sister Karras)
Best Actress	Jemma Moore (Eric)
Best Actress	Katherine Casto (Weak)
Best Actress	Therica Wilson-Read (Coyote)
Best Supporting Actor	Sam Barnard (Monico Perseus)
Best Supporting Actor	Craig Conway (Burnt Toast and Cigarettes)
Best Supporting Actor	Jack Cain (Good Guy with a Gun)
Best Supporting Actor	Rory Wilton (Encore)
Best Supporting Actor	Sule Rimi (Stillness)
Best Supporting Actress	Tiffany Bedwell (Good Guy with a Gun)
Best Supporting Actress	Bridget Regen (Weak)
Best Supporting Actress	Emily Wyatt (The Last Heist)
Best Supporting Actress	Rhea Bailey (Stillness)
Best Cinematography	The Light That No One Sees (Pasindu Goldmann)
Best Cinematography	Beloc The Blind (Yaroslav Prokhorov)
Best Cinematography	Blue Boy (Jannis Schelenz)
Best Cinematography	Encore (Elliot Millson)
Best Cinematography	Five Thousand Six Hundred Ninety-Sven Pounds (John Orphan)
Best Score	Langford Tales (Christos Andreou)
Best Score	Beloc The Blind (Nerea Alberdi)
Best Score	Borrowed Time (Kristen Price)
Best Score	Encore (Reuben Squirrel)
Best Score	Everything is out to get me (Thom Robson)
Best Score	Little Mary (Adam Radmall)
Best Score	Out and About (Jano Manzali)
Best Score	Stillness (Jered Sorkin)
The Jury Prize	Encore
Audience Choice	Best Feature Film – Coyote
Audience Choice	Best Feature Film – Left of Chopin
Audience Choice	Best Feature Film – Publish or Perish
Audience Choice	Best Short Film – Care
Audience Choice	Best Short Film – Eric
Audience Choice	Best Documentary – Drawn to War
Audience Choice	Best Performance – Danny Ashkenasi (The Pit and Pendulum – A Musciabre)
Audience Choice	Best Performance – Alan Cooper (Claudia)

2024 Season Nominations & Award Winners
Award	Nominee / Award Winner
Best British Film	Fyre Rises
Best British Film	Kill Your Lover
Best British Film	Melodrive
Best British Film	Mr Doom
Best British Film	The Move
Best British Film	10 Swords and the Moon
Best Documentary Film	#RevolutionaryOne
Best Documentary Film	Big Smooth
Best Documentary Film	Diary of an Elephant Orphan
Best Documentary Film	Kim's Video
Best Documentary Film	Ray of Hope
Best Documentary Film	The Gardener
Best Short Film	(Dis)connected
Best Short Film	Art
Best Short Film	Fitting Descriptions
Best Short Film	Lies on the Line
Best Short Film	Mouse!
Best Short Film	Opening Up
Best Short Film	The Sea
Best Short Film	The Snip
Best Short Film	Tits
Best International Film	Folie A Famille
Best International Film	Hans Crosses the Rubicon
Best International Film	Indelible Memories
Best International Film	Old Righteous Blues
Best International Film	Once and for Real
Best International Film	Sleeping Close
Best International Film	Somparire
Best International Film	Villains Inc
Best International Film	What We Don't Say
Best Local Film	Beholden
Best Local Film	Burnt Flowers
Best Local Film	Fyre Rises
Best Local Film	The Grey Room
Best Local Film	The Night Blooms
Best Local Film	Wuss
Best Animation	Scale
Best Animation	Supertramp
Best No or Low Budget Film	Alleviate
Best No or Low Budget Film	Bin Day
Best No or Low Budget Film	Hearts Desire
Best No or Low Budget Film	All I Remember
Best No or Low Budget Film	The Lure
Best No or Low Budget Film	The Night Blooms
Best Director	Ben Kernow (Art)
Best Director	Derek Shimoda (The Gardener)
Best Director	Kate Surinskaya (Tea)
Best Director	Muneera Sallies (Old Righteous Blues)
Best Director	Mark Schlichter (Class Trip Chaos)
Best Director	Max Mir (Walking Fernando)
Best Director	Ryan Singh & Nikila Cole (Ray of Hope)
Best Screenplay	Alex Sereno (Folie A Familie)
Best Screenplay	Andy Kastelic (The Fox)
Best Screenplay	Daniel Keeble (Alleviate)
Best Screenplay	Elliot Warren (Hard Times)
Best Screenplay	Jamie Effros (Big George)
Best Screenplay	Kammy Darweish (The Consequence)
Best Screenplay	Matt Moen (Villains Incorporated)
Best Screenplay	María Magdalena Cotun (Teodoro)
Best Actor	Alexander Lincoln (Losing It)
Best Actor	Ayden Croy (Old Righteous Blues)
Best Actor	Danny Sutcliffe (Mr Doom)
Best Actor	Ed White (Under the Blue)
Best Actor	Elliot Warren (Hard Times)
Best Actor	Gary Beadle (Opening Up)
Best Actor	Jake Hall (Big George)
Best Actor	Kammy Darweish (The Consequence)
Best Actress	Ania Marson (Ruth)
Best Actress	Angela Harvey (Her Castle)
Best Actress	Charlotte Coleman (A Positive Contribution)
Best Actress	Fabienne Piolini-Castle (Walking Fernando)
Best Actress	Lucy Davis (Have a Good Day)
Best Actress	Steph Parry (Under the Blue)
Best Actress	Tamzin Outhwaite (Opening Up)
Best Supporting Actor	Colin Mochrie (Villains Inc)
Best Supporting Actor	Greg Sestero (The Founder Effect)
Best Supporting Actor	Javier Bardem (Walking Fernando)
Best Supporting Actor	Luis Cao (Teodoro)
Best Supporting Actor	Oscar Reed (The Interpreter)
Best Supporting Actor	Simon Callow (Murder Ballads: How to Make It in Rock N Roll)
Best Supporting Actress	Chos (Teodoro)
Best Supporting Actress	Dee Wallace (Roswell Delirium)
Best Supporting Actress	Leslie Ash (Ruth)
Best Supporting Actress	Megan Alderson (Melodrive)
Best Supporting Actress	Michelle Collins (Melodrive)
Best Supporting Actress	Nicola Walker (Under the Blue)
Best Supporting Actress	Prue Griffiths (Bin Day)
Best Editing	Big George
Best Editing	Far
Best Editing	Hans Crosses the Rubicon
Best Editing	Lemon Tree
Best Editing	Old Righteous Blues
Best Editing	Under the Blue
Best Editing	Fairplay
Best Cinematography	Adrian Wolfson (Deserters)
Best Cinematography	Caelan Benn (Have a Good Day)
Best Cinematography	Christoph Iwanow and Conrad Lobst (Class Trip Chaos)
Best Cinematography	Jannis Schelenz (The Countryman)
Best Cinematography	Pui Man Leung (Saving Art)
Best Score	Dan Tait (The Founder Effect)
Best Score	Edward George King (Old Righteous Blues)
Best Score	Jorge Magaz (Teodoro)
Best Score	Lionel Gaget (Angel Touch) (Third Eye)
Best Score	Marco Mancini (Somparire)
Best Score	Sean McAllister (Strings)
Best Score	The Strange Blue Dreams (Socks)
Best Score	Matt Olivio (Unspeakable: Beyond the Wall of Sleep)
Best Original Concept	Art
Best Original Concept	Black Sunflowers
Best Original Concept	Chairs
Best Original Concept	Children of the Pines
Best Original Concept	Far
Best Original Concept	Layers of Lies
Best Original Concept	Lies on the Line
Best Original Concept	Roswell Delirium
Best Original Concept	Third Eye
First Time Filmmaker	Daniel Ellerby (Her Castle)
First Time Filmmaker	Emma Richardson (Unthinkable Conversations)
First Time Filmmaker	Ian Bartholomew (The Sea)
First Time Filmmaker	Kammy Darweish (The Consequence)
First Time Filmmaker	Lee Bamsy (Aborted)
First Time Filmmaker	Mitchell Tolliday (Murder Ballads: How to Make It in Rock N Roll)
First Time Filmmaker	Nadine Wilson (Wuss)
Best Production Design	Her Castle
Best Production Design	Kill Your Lover
Best Production Design	Lies on the Line
Best Production Design	Progeny
Best Production Design	Ruth
Best Production Design	War Blade
Best Production Design	Hardangerfolk
Best Production Design	Burnt Flowers
Outstanding Contribution	Ark Pictures
The Jury Prize	The Consequence
Audience Choice	Opening Up (Short Film)
Audience Choice	Sleeping Close (Feature Film)
Audience Choice	Ray of Hope (Documentary)
Audience Choice	Steph Parry - Under the Blue (Performance)
Audience Choice	Louise-Ann Monro - Beholden (Performance)

== See also ==
- Spencer Hawken
- Romford Horror Film Festival
