= Death Walks =

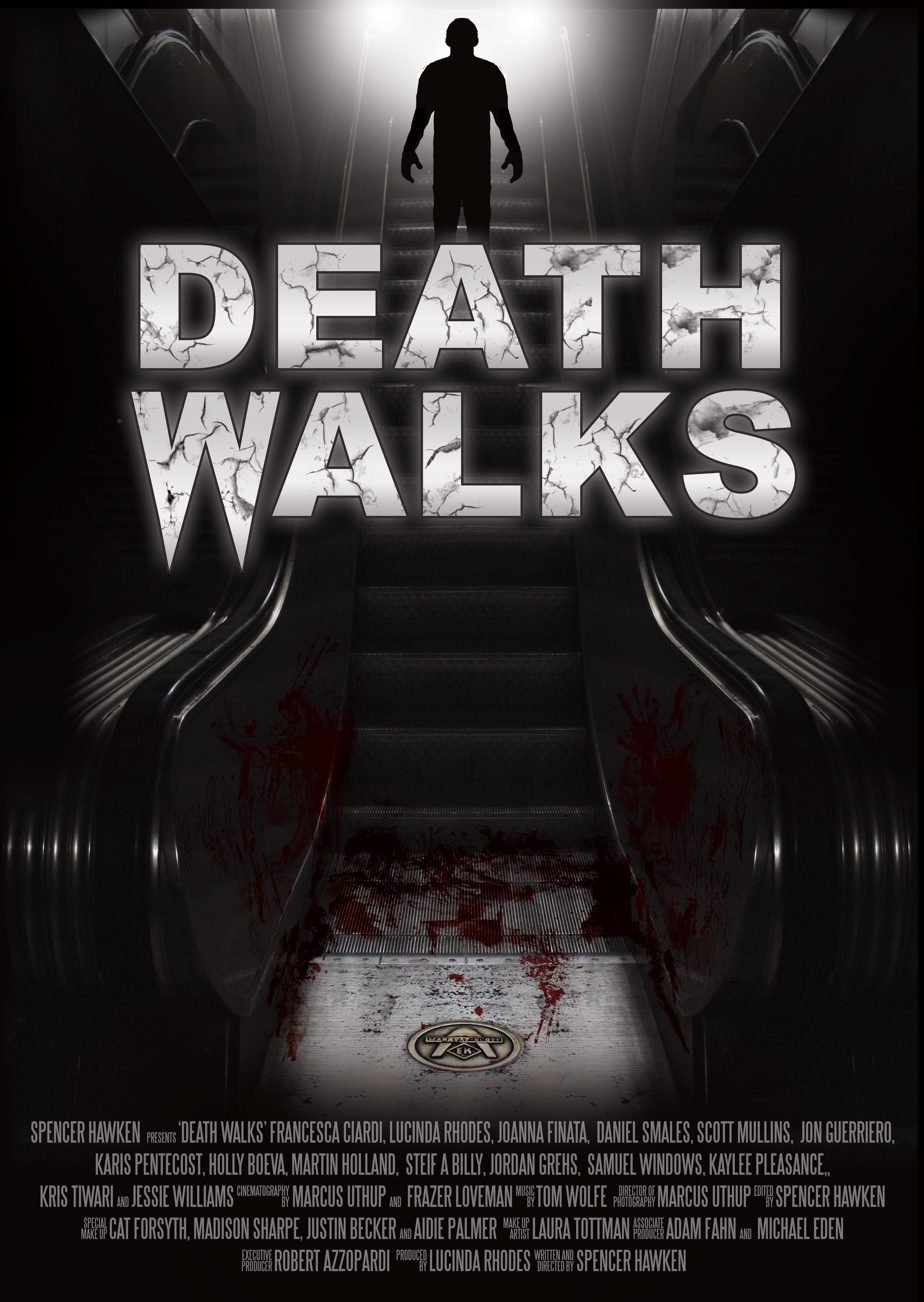
- Film poster
- Directed by: Spencer Hawken
- Written by: Spencer Hawken
- Produced by: Spencer Hawken; Lucinda Rhodes
- Starring: Lucinda Rhodes; Francesca Ciardi; Jessie Williams
- Cinematography: Marcus Uthup; Frazer Loveman
- Edited by: Spencer Hawken
- Music by: Tom Wolfe
- Production company: Views From The Edge
- Release date: 15 July 2016
- Country: United Kingdom
- Language: English

Death Walks is a zero-budget horror film directed by Spencer Hawken. The film stars Jessie Williams, Lucinda Rhodes-Flaherty, and Francesca Ciardi, and centres on a group of people trying to survive inside a shopping center that is under attack by the dead. Death Walks is Ciardi's first horror film since her role as Faye Daniels in the 1980 film Cannibal Holocaust and her first film role in over 20 years, her previous film being 1991's Safari.

== Synopsis ==
In an East London shopping centre, a group of people are warned by a strange Italian woman (Francesca Ciardi) that they are all going to die. Her warnings prove to be all too real, as the shopping center is then attacked by zombies fueled by an evil supernatural power. The 25 people remaining in the shopping centre must band together to survive the night. This is made more difficult by the rising tensions as well as the fact that the surrounding town is oblivious of their torment due to a street party.

== Cast ==
- Francesca Ciardi as Lucrezia
- Lucinda Rhodes-Flaherty as Louise
- Jon Guerriero as John
- Jessie Williams as Poppy
- Joanna Finata as Alice
- Daniel Smales as Steve
- Scott Mullins as Rob
- Karis Pentecost as Beth

== Production ==
Hawken began work on Death Walks in the summer of 2013. Filming took place in Romford, London, during 2013, and included multiple extras, many of whom were volunteers from the surrounding community. Many supporters and businesses offered Hawken the use of filming locations and supplies via gifts or by loaning them to the production, allowing him to complete the film through crowdsourcing techniques. Filming took place at the Mercury Mall shopping center, which donated the use of its space. This was originally intended to take place over a 24-hour period, but it instead took place over four months. During this time the cast swelled from 300 extras to nearly 1,000.

Filming began on 15 July 2013 and was completed on 17 November of the same year. Editing was expected to be completed by February of the following year. A successful Kickstarter campaign was launched during January 2014 in order to help with the cost of submitting Death Walks to film festivals. That same month Hawken noted that he was already working on a sequel.

== Release ==
Death Walks premiered at the Mercury Mall on 15 July 2016, exactly three years from the time shooting begun. The film went on to screen at the 2016 British Horror Film Festival, where it was nominated for several awards, winning Best Supporting Actor (Jon Guerriero) and Best Music (Tom Wolfe). It also screened at the Terror Film Festival on 20 October 2016, where it was also nominated for several awards.

== Reception ==
After the premiere, the Romford Recorder newspaper was quick to herald the movie a success, calling it funny, unsettling and surprising.

Since its release the film has been reviewed by Dread Central and Scream. Dread Central's Matt Boiselle gave Death Walks a rating of 3/5, criticizing several elements of the film while also writing that "the film is fairly amusing; and for a first-time directorial spin, Hawken manages to deliver on the goods of putting out a maiden voyage presentation." Scream's Kieran Fisher rated the movie more highly at 4 stars, calling it the "little engine that could" and that "While it doesn’t rewrite the rule book of the zombie sub-genre, it does refreshing reminder that the undead still have some life in them after all."

== Awards ==
Year	Nominee / work	Award	Result
2016	Jon Guerriero / Best Supporting Actor	British Horror Film Festival	Won
2016	Lucinda Rhodes / Best Supporting Actress	British Horror Film Festival	Nominated
2016	Spencer Hawken / Best Feature Film	British Horror Film Festival	Nominated
2016	Spencer Hawken / British Horror Award	British Horror Film Festival	Nominated
2016	Tom Wolfe / Best Music	British Horror Film Festival	Won
2016	Spencer Hawken / Best Director	Puerto Rico Horror Film Festival	Nominated
2016	Marcus Uthup / Best Cinematography	Terror Film Festival	Nominated
2016	Tom Wolfe / Best Original Music Score	Terror Film Festival	Nominated
2016	Spencer Hawken / Best Feature Film Screenplay	Terror Film Festival	Nominated
2016	Spencer Hawken / Best Motion Picture Editing	Terror Film Festival	Nominated
2016	Shaun Lee / Best Sound Design	Terror Film Festival	Nominated
2016	Spencer Hawken / Excellence in the craft of Screenwriting	Terror Film Festival	Nominated

== See also ==
- Spencer Hawken
- No Reasons
