= Heather Grace Hancock =

American actress

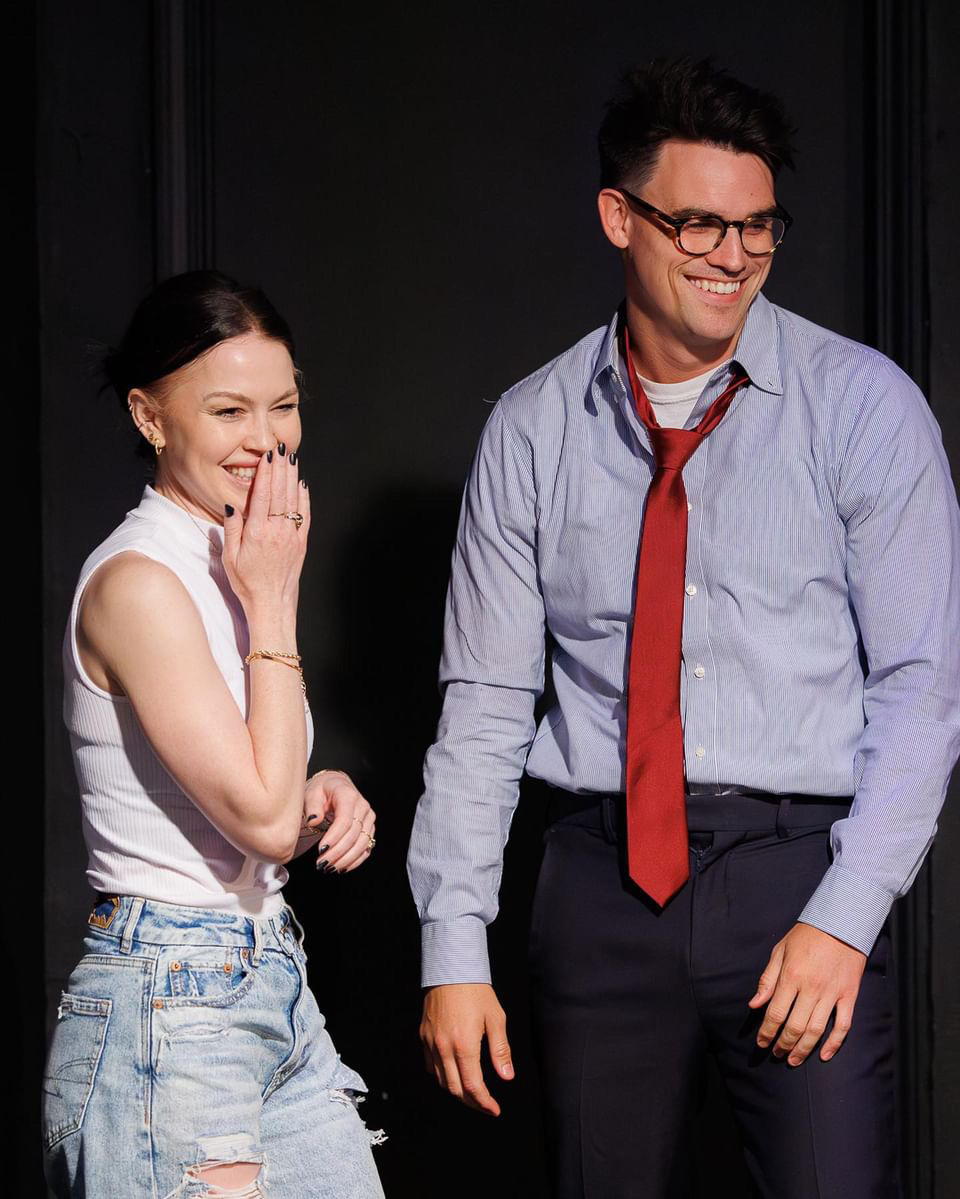
- Occupation: Actress
- Years active: 2010–present

Heather Grace Hancock is an American TV actress and presenter who is known for her performances in Wicked City, Grey's Anatomy, American Crime, NCIS, NCIS: LA, Truth Be Told, S.W.A.T., Cooper Barrett's Guide to Surviving Life, Pink Collar Crimes, The Fosters, and Criminal Minds. She has also co-hosted the TV series Collider TV Talk.

== Career ==
Hancock got her first major recurring television role in 2015 when she was cast as Mallory Kharchenko, in the drama series Wicked City and starred opposite Ed Westwick, Erika Christensen, and Taissa Farmiga.

She played the lead role of "Rayna" in the horror drama Pretty Boy and was nominated for Best Actress at the Romford Film Festival.

She starred opposite General Hospital’s Coby Ryan McLaughlin in the holiday rom-com The Package.

Hancock appeared in the indie film Brute 1986, an 1980s-inspired slasher movie, where she starred alongside Bill Kaulitz, Gigi Gustin, Sarah French, and Lew Temple.

== Filmography ==
Title	Year	Role
The Necklace	2010	Rose
The Alley	2010	Lucy
Lines	2010	Mary
Placeparted	2011	Liz
How I Might Have Met Jamie	2011	Jamie
The Gig	2011	Juliet
Perchance	2011	Jackie
Fidelity	2011	Adele
Darling, So it Goes	2011	Kim
60 Seconds	2011	Katia
America’s Superwoman, Next Action Diva	2012	Contestant
Useless	2012	Young Woman
High Fidelity	2012	Laura
Bobo Noir	2014	Girl with Bum/Apartment Owner/Agent's Assistant
Grey's Anatomy	2014	Female Intern
It Had to Be You	2015	Sierra
Wicked City	2015	Mallory Kharchenko
Cooper Barrett's Guide to Surviving Life	2016	Kristen
Joshy the Hitman (2016)	2016	Lauren
West Wing: The Next Generation	2016	Malorie McGarry
Film HQ (2016) - Actress (voice)	2016	Actress (voice)
The Movie Trivia Schmoedown	2016-2022	Presenter
American Crime (2017)	2017	Christina
Awesometacular with Jeremy Jahns	2017	Actress
Seven Blue 365 (2017)	2017	Amy
Dear Kimberly (2017)	2017	Kimberly
The Fosters (2018)	2018	Younger Woman
Pink Collar Crimes	2018	Detective Sara Fields
Blood Bride (2018)	2018	Nurse Nicki
Criminal Minds	2018	Agent Cheryl Price
Are You Sleeping	2019	Julia
Stage Four	2019	Ethan's Mom
Truth Be Told	2019-2021	Julia
The Package	2020	Jules
Pretty Boy	2021	Rayna
Hollywood Stargirl	2022	Manager
Beyond Belief: Fact or Fiction	2022	Hailey
NCIS: LA	2023	Robin Wassner
S.W.A.T	2023	Waitress

== See also ==
- Romford Film Festival
- Passionflix
- List of horror films of 2021
- Wicked City (TV series)
