= Piggy (2012 film) =

British horror drama film

- Directed by: Kieron Hawkes
- Screenplay by: Kieron Hawkes
- Produced by: Danny Potts; Leo Pearlman
- Starring: Martin Compston; Neil Maskell; Paul Anderson; Rachel Dylan; Ed Skrein; Roland Manookian
- Edited by: Benjamin Turner
- Music by: Bill Ryder-Jones
- Production companies: Fulwell 73; DP Film Productions
- Release date: 4 May 2012
- Running time: 106 minutes
- Country: United Kingdom
- Language: English

Piggy is a 2012 British horror crime film. It is written and directed by Kieron Hawkes, and produced by Fulwell 73 and DP Film Productions. It stars Martin Compston, Paul Anderson, Ed Skrein and Neil Maskell.

== Synopsis ==
In London, Joe (Compston) has sunk into depression after his brother is murdered on his way home after a night out. The police think it looks like an open-and-shut case. However, a man, Piggy (Anderson), arrives. Claiming to be a friend of Joe's brother, Piggy wants revenge—but is Piggy real or a figment of Joe's imagination?

== Cast ==
- Martin Compston as Joe
- Rachel Dylan as Claire
- Roland Manookian as Craig
- Neil Maskell as John
- Paul Anderson as Piggy
- Ed Skrein as Jamie

== Production ==
The film was produced by Danny Potts and Leo Pearlman for Fulwell 73 and DP Film Productions with Creativity Media, and directed by Kieron Hawkes. The project's executive producers were Gabe Turner, Joe Moore and Patrick Fischer.

== Release ==
The film had a limited UK cinema release on May 4, 2012.

== Reception ==
On the review aggregator website Rotten Tomatoes, Piggy holds an approval rating of 18% based on 11 reviews.

=== Critical reception ===
Mark Kermode on the Kermode and Mayo's Film Review show on BBC Radio 5 Live called it “Death Wish for shoegazers” and “strangely disturbing, ultimately unsatisfying”. The Guardian felt it lacked subtlety but compared Anderson's swaggering performance to the character of Tyler Durden in Fight Club.
