= Teenage Health Freak =

British television series

- Genre: Comedy, teen drama
- Created by: Danny Peacock
- Starring: Alex Langdon; Liza Walker; Danny Peacock; Tilly Vosburgh
- Country of origin: United Kingdom
- Original language: English
- No. of series: 2
- No. of episodes: 12

Production
- Producer: Adrian Bate
- Running time: 30 minutes each

Original release
- Network: Channel 4
- Release: 21 May 1991 – 29 March 1993

Teenage Health Freak is a British teen comedy-drama television series, about the life and travails of a socially awkward teenage boy. It was based on the book Diary of a Teenage Health Freak, by Dr. Ann McPherson and Dr. Aidan Macfarlane. The series was directed by Peter Cattaneo.
