= Roland Manookian =

British actor (born 1980)

- Born: 21 February 1980 (age 46); London, United Kingdom
- Occupation: Actor
- Years active: 1999–present

Roland Manookian (born 21 February 1980) is a British actor from London. He is known for his roles in the films The Football Factory (2004) and Rise of the Footsoldier (2007). On television, he appeared in The Bill (1999), The Vice (2000), and Dunkirk (2004). His other films include The Business (2005), RocknRolla (2007), Dead Cert (2010), Piggy (2012), and Once Upon a Time in London (2018). His most recent role was playing the regular character of Teddy Mitchell in the BBC soap opera EastEnders.

== Early life ==
Manookian was born in London and grew up in Bermondsey in the south of the city. He is a Lom of Armenian descent. He is a supporter of Millwall FC.

== Career ==
Manookian's acting career took off with his role as Zeberdee in the 2004 film The Football Factory. In 2007, he starred as Craig Rolfe in Rise of the Footsoldier, alongside Craig Fairbrass and Terry Stone. He has also appeared in Guy Ritchie's Rocknrolla, which went to number one in the UK box office in September 2008, in a cast which included Tom Wilkinson, Gerard Butler, Mark Strong, Idris Elba, and Tom Hardy. Manookian has appeared in Nick Love's Goodbye Charlie Bright and The Business. He has also appeared in episodes of The Bill in 1999 as Ben Glover.

In 2014, Manookian was cast to play the role of Julian in Spencer Hawken's 2016 film No Reasons.

In 2024, Manookian joined the BBC soap opera EastEnders, as Teddy Mitchell. Upon his casting, Manookian shared, "I've been watching EastEnders my whole life, so being part of it is amazing... Coming in as a Mitchell means you've got big shoes to fill, but it's a challenge that I'm happy to accept." On 7 December 2025, it was announced that his character would be written out the following year.

== Filmography ==
=== Television ===
Year	Title	Role	Notes
1999	The Bill	Ben Glover	2 episodes
1999	Great Expectations	Pip's Servant	Television film
1999	Oliver Twist	Charley Bates	3 episodes
2000	Storm Damage	Paul	Television film
2000	The Vice	Nathan Cairns	2 episodes
2000	Killers	Tommy	TV short
2001	As If	Jeff	Episode: "Alex's Birthday"
2002	Murder	Ryan McGuinness	
2004	Dunkirk	Frankie Osbourne	
2009	The Bill	Gavin Downey	2 episodes
2014	Power to the People	Arthur	Television film
2024–2025	EastEnders	Teddy Mitchell	regular role

=== Film ===
Year	Title	Role	Notes
1999	The Escort	Bellboy	
2001	Goodbye Charlie Bright	Justin	
2001	Green Green Lanes	Archie Hams	Short film
2003	Oh Marbella!	Bradley	
2004	The Football Factory	Zeberdee	
2005	The Business	Sonny	
2007	Grow Your Own	Mike	
2007	Rise of the Footsoldier	Craig Rolfe	
2008	RocknRolla	Bandy	
2010	Just for the Record	Harlan Noble	
2010	Dead Cert	Chinnery	
2011	Fish n' Chips	Dave	
2011	Big Fat Gypsy Gangster	Roland	
2012	Piggy	Craig	
2012	The Rise and Fall of a White Collar Hooligan	Rusty	
2015	Rise of the Footsoldier 2: Reign of the General	Craig Rolfe	Flashback
2016	No Reasons	Julian	
2016	Jewels	Craig	Short film
2017	Riot	Steve	
2017	London Heist	Sammy	
2017	Fanged Up	Albert	
2017	Rise of the Footsoldier 3: The Pat Tate Story	Craig Rolfe	
2018	Once Upon a Time in London	Mad Frankie Fraser	
2019	Rise of the Footsoldier: Marbella	Craig Rolfe	
2020	His House	Barber	
2021	Rise of the Footsoldier: Origins	Craig Rolfe	
