= Stuart Manning =

English actor, model and voice-over artist (born 1979)

- Born: 27 May 1979 (age 47)
- Occupations: Actor; model; voice-over artist
- Years active: 1997–present
- Agent: Wintersons
- Known for: Hollyoaks
- Television: Hollyoaks (2004–2009, 2018); I'm a Celebrity... Get Me Out of Here! (2009)
- Height: 6 ft (183 cm)

Stuart Manning (born 27 May 1979) is an English actor, model and voice-over artist. He is known for portraying Russ Owen in the Channel 4 soap opera Hollyoaks from 2004 to 2009 and again in 2018. He won the Hero of the Year award at the 2002 British Soap Awards for his performance in the ITV series Night and Day.

== Career ==
Manning was represented by Models One during his early modelling career. Manning has said that his first Abercrombie & Fitch photo shoot took place at The Ring boxing club in London in 1997. In a 2022 retrospective post, he shared a photograph from his modelling work for Bliss magazine, which he dated to 1999.

Manning played Sam Armstrong in the ITV soap opera Night and Day. Manning won the 2002 British Soap Awards "Hero of the Year" award for that role. He played Mark Thompson in an episode of Holby City before joining the cast of Hollyoaks in 2004. After five years of playing the role of Russell Owen, Manning decided to quit the show. He left the series in a storyline that saw him kidnap his baby son Max and leave the country.

He appeared as a contestant on the ninth series of I'm a Celebrity... Get Me Out of Here! in 2009. He finished overall in fifth place on the show.

In December 2009, Manning and fellow contestant Gino D'Acampo faced animal cruelty charges after a rat was killed and eaten during filming. The case against both men was dropped in February 2010 after ITV Studios pleaded guilty to animal cruelty and was fined.

In 2010, he made a guest appearance as himself in the BBC Three comedy Mongrels.

Manning appeared alongside Kay Mellor and Anthony Lewis in A Passionate Woman at Hull Truck Theatre in 2010 and on its UK tour in 2011. He played Craze, the former lover of Mellor’s character.

In 2014, Manning provided the voice-over for Cuprinol's Cheer It Up television advertising campaign.

In 2014, he appeared in an episode of Doctors as Paul Carter, and in 2015, he also appeared in The Dumping Ground as Matt Branston and Casualty as Clyde Jackson, in the last of a trio of special Casualty film noir episodes.

Manning played Robin in Spencer Hawken's film No Reasons.

He played Dan, the father of the central character, in the 2017 family film You Can Tutu, directed by James Brown.

In 2017, he appeared as Nik Voyle in the first episode of the school drama series Ackley Bridge and reprised his role of Nik again in series two in 2018.

In August 2018, he returned to the role of Russ Owen in Hollyoaks after an absence of nine years. Manning departed the show again in November 2018 when Russ was killed off.

In September 2020, Manning took part in filming the historical television production Glow & Darkness in Spain.

== Personal life ==
In 2002, Manning briefly dated the singer Lulu.

In 2010, Manning participated in an underwater photo shoot at Clothes Show London in support of the clean-water charity fresh2o.

During a 2018 appearance on Loose Women, Manning discussed how dyslexia affected his ability to learn scripts. He explained that his agent in the United States helped by reading his lines aloud and recording them for repeated listening.

== Filmography ==
Year	Title	Role	Notes
2001–2003	Night and Day	Sam Armstrong	Recurring role
2004	Holby City	Mark Thompson	Episode: "You Can Choose Your Friends"
2004–2009, 2018	Hollyoaks	Russ Owen	Series regular
2008	Hollyoaks Later	Russ Owen	
2009	I'm a Celebrity... Get Me Out of Here!	Himself	Contestant (5th place)
2010	Mongrels	Himself	Episode: "Destiny the Reluctant Sniffer Dog"
2012	Banged Up Abroad	Dwight Worker	Episode: "Mexico/Black Palace Of Horrors"
2014	Doctors	Paul Carter	Episode: "The Soundtrack of Your Life"
2015	The Dumping Ground	Matt Branston	Episode: "Party Games"
2015	Casualty	Clyde Jackson	Episode: "Holby Sin City"
2016	No Reasons	Robin	Feature film
2017	You Can Tutu	Dan	Feature film
2017–2018	Ackley Bridge	Nik Voyle	Guest role

== Awards ==
Year	Award	Category	Work	Result
2002	British Soap Awards	Hero of the Year	Night and Day	Won
