= Big Fat Gypsy Gangster =

2011 British comedy film

- Promotional Poster
- Directed by: Ricky Grover
- Written by: Ricky Grover; Maria Grover
- Produced by: Ricky Grover; Jonathan Sothcott; Paul Silver; Maria Grover
- Starring: Ricky Grover; Steven Berkoff; Peter Capaldi; Omid Djalili; Rochelle Wiseman; Tulisa Contostavlos; Rufus Hound
- Cinematography: Gary Shaw
- Edited by: Jason de Vyea
- Music by: Venti Venti Media
- Distributed by: 4Digital Media
- Release date: 14 September 2011
- Running time: 91 minutes
- Country: United Kingdom
- Language: English

Big Fat Gypsy Gangster is a straight-to-DVD British comedy film directed, produced, written by and starring Ricky Grover. The film centres on Grover's character Bulla from The 11 O'Clock Show, after his release from prison. The film was written by Grover and his wife Maria, and the cast includes Steven Berkoff, Peter Capaldi, Omid Djalili, Rufus Hound and Tulisa Contostavlos.

== Plot ==
The film begins with Bulla (Ricky Grover), a well known dangerous criminal, being released from prison after serving 16 years for burglary. However, as soon as he is released back into society, he finds himself being followed by a film crew. With the world at his fingertips, Bulla returns home to find that everything he was once part of has been taken over by corrupt police officer Conrad (Eddie Webber), the man who put Bulla behind bars. Bulla vows to regain everything that was once his, and begins his offensive by being interviewed on national television by Michael Parkinson.

== Cast ==
- Ricky Grover as Bulla
- Steven Berkoff as Guru Shah
- Peter Capaldi as Peter Van
- Omid Djalili as Jik Jickels
- Laila Morse as Aunt Queenie
- Tulisa Contostavlos as Shanikwa
- Rochelle Wiseman as Jodieh
- Rufus Hound as Kai
- Eddie Webber as Conrad
- Dave Legeno as Dave
- Leo Gregory as Danny
- Geoff Bell as Geoff
- Roland Manookian as Roland
- Andy Linden as Lenny
- Leanne Lakey as Bev
- Derek Acorah as Himself
- Michael Parkinson as Himself
- Joshua Lou Friedman
- Maxwell Laird
