= Harry and Cosh =

British television series

- Genre: Sitcom
- Created by: Daniel Peacock
- Starring: Harry Capehorn; Coshti Dowden; Lucinda Rhodes-Flaherty; Gemma Baker; Linda Regan; Sadie Wilson
- Country of origin: United Kingdom
- Original language: English
- No. of series: 4
- No. of episodes: 46

Production
- Producer: Georgia Dussaud

Original release
- Network: Channel 5
- Release: 30 October 1999 – 12 July 2003

Harry and Cosh was a British children's television series directed by Daniel Peacock shown on Saturday afternoons on Shake! on Channel 5.

It starred Harry Capehorn, Coshti Dowden, Lucinda Rhodes-Flaherty, Gemma Baker and Linda Regan. It told the story of two teenagers, their relationship problems and dysfunctional families. It ran for 46 episodes from 30 October 1999 to 12 July 2003. Frankie Fitzgerald, Ricky Diamond and Carly Hillman appeared in some episodes as guest stars.

In 2001, it was nominated for a BAFTA.
