= Daniel Peacock =

English actor, director, writer and carer (born 1958)

- Born: 2 October 1958 (age 67); Hammersmith, London, England
- Occupations: Actor; director; writer; lifestyles co-ordinator
- Years active: 1978–present
- Notable work: Only Fools and Horses; The Comic Strip Presents...; Cavegirl; Marley's Ghosts
- Parent: Trevor Peacock (father)
- Relatives: Harry Peacock (half-brother)

Daniel Peacock (born 2 October 1958) is an English actor, director, writer and carer. He has worked with the team of The Comic Strip Presents... and played "Mental Mickey" in Only Fools and Horses.

== Early and personal life ==
Peacock was born on 2 October 1958 in Hammersmith, London. He is the son of late actor and composer Trevor Peacock (who played Jim Trott in The Vicar of Dibley) and Iris Jones, and the half-brother of actor Harry Peacock. He attended Ashmole School in Southgate, London.

== Career ==
He attended the Central School of Speech & Drama before leaving early to pursue a career as a comedian in an act called the 'Diamond Brothers' with Liam Galvin. He worked as a bluecoat for a Pontins Holiday camp in Selsey, West Sussex in 1978.

Peacock has also had success as a television series writer credited with Teenage Health Freak (C4), Sister Said, Cavegirl (BBC) and other successful series. He also wrote and starred in the film Party Party.

In the early 1980s, Peacock fronted a short-lived band called The Wild Men of Wonga.

He moved into acting and writing and his credits as an actor include the following television series: Assaulted Nuts, The Young Ones, Little Armadillos, Only Fools and Horses, Robin of Sherwood, The Bill, Doctor Who as Nord the Vandal in the serial The Greatest Show in the Galaxy, Casualty and One Foot in the Grave.

Peacock also appeared in the third series of Coming of Age as DK's estranged father, Jim Karrimor.

His film appearances include Porridge, Bloody Kids, The Supergrass, Riding High, Quadrophenia, Gandhi, I Bought a Vampire Motorcycle, Party Party, Whoops Apocalypse, Bull in Robin Hood: Prince of Thieves, and Carry On Columbus. He also played young Jacques Clouseau in Trail of the Pink Panther and appeared in The Jewel of the Nile as the special effects maestro.

He was a regular cast member in Nick Hyde and Glen Cardno's Valentine Park for Central Television starring Ken Jones, David Thewlis and Liz Smith and wrote Men of the World starring John Simm and David Threlfall, Cavegirl, Harry and Cosh, Mud, Very Big Very Soon for Central TV starring Paul Shane, Sheila White, Shaun Curry and Tim Wylton, as well as adapting Teenage Health Freak for TV. He voiced a Beeposaurus in The Beeps.

He appeared in a series of musical adverts in the 1980s for the Do It All chain of DIY stores along with another Comic Strip actor, Ron Tarr, and the Birds Eye Steakhouse advertisement featuring the song "We Hope It's Chips", sung to the tune of "Que Sera Sera".

Peacock also appeared as a thug in "Billy's Christmas Angels", a Channel 4 Christmas special broadcast in 1988, alongside Nabil Shaban and Stephen Johnson.

His credits as a director include the metaseries Harry and Cosh, Morris 2274, Billie: Girl from the Future and Cavegirl.

In 2014, Peacock made a cameo appearance in his brother Harry Peacock's comedy show Toast of London.

In 2015, he wrote and appeared in the sitcom Marley's Ghosts, which revolves around a woman called Marley Wise who finds she can communicate with the dead. The series first aired on Gold in September 2015.

In 2016, Peacock played the role of Maurice in Spencer Hawken's No Reasons.

Since around 2019, Peacock has been working as a lifestyles co-ordinator at Hastings Court Care Home in East Sussex, resulting in a nomination for a National Care Award in 2022.
