= Spencer Hawken =

British film producer and director

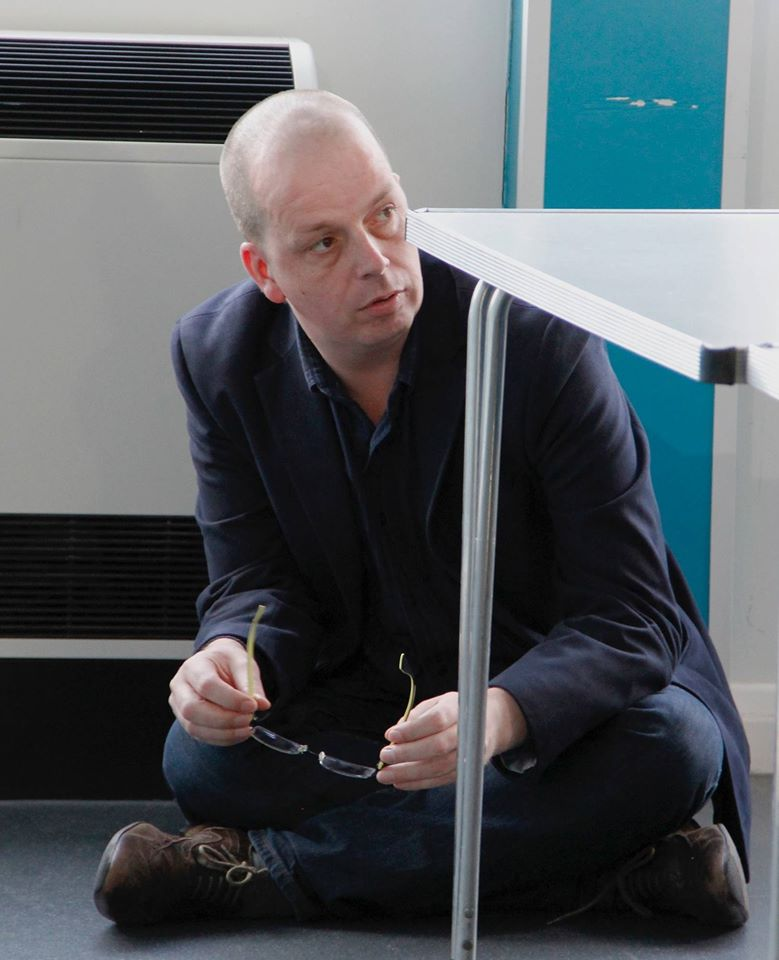
- Spencer on the set of No Reasons
- Born: 6 May 1973 (age 53); Essex, United Kingdom
- Occupations: Director, writer, producer, film critic, charity founder
- Years active: 2004–present

Spencer Hawken (born 6 May 1973) is a British film producer, director, writer, and former film critic. His work includes Death Walks and No Reasons.

== Career ==
Hawken has worked as a retailer and fashion director at Debenhams, during which time he worked with Belinda Earl and Ben de Lisi to launch Designers at Debenhams. Within this role he appeared on TV shows such as BBC's Would Like To Meet, The Big Breakfast, RI:SE and GMTV.

In 2013 he began working on Death Walks, a zero-budget horror movie that starred Francesca Ciardi, Lucinda Rhodes and Jessie Williams. He later made the film No Reasons, for which Rhodes and Williams both returned.

In August 2015 Hawken's production of Road Rage was forced to change direction when its lead actor George Cole died.

No Reasons is a thriller film directed by Hawken. The film stars Marc Bannerman, Lucinda Rhodes, Daniel Peacock, Roland Manookian, and Stuart Manning. It marks the return of Anna Karen to feature films after an eight-year break.

Since 2017 Hawken has run the Romford Film Festival. In 2020 the festival was the first physical festival in the UK post COVID-19 outbreak.

Hawken founded Romford Horror Film Festival in 2020 and the first festival took place in summer 2021.

In 2021 Hawken along with Marat Akhmedjanov, led the first ever UK film delegation to Uzbekistan for the Tashkent Film Festival, since the beginning of President Shavkat Mirziyoyev's term, he has championed great change in the country and the invitation to the UK delegates was part of this change.

As of 2021 Hawken consults for Netflix with The Takedown, Mothership and You People being subjects of his consultancy.

In 2025 Hawken formed the Romford Film Trust a charity specialising in the screening, preservation and education of film to the widest possible audience subsequently opening the Lumiere cinema in Romford.

== Personal life ==
Hawken was born in Essex, United Kingdom, and now resides in London, United Kingdom.

== Filmography ==
- The Grief Tourist (2012) Consultant
- Cinema Six (2012) Consultant
- Sunset Strip (2012) Consultant
- Vegetarian Cannibal (2012) Consultant
- Revisited (2014) Producer
- Death Walks (2016) Director/Producer
- No Reasons (2016) Director/Producer
- The Grey Room (2020) Associate Producer
- And I (2021) Executive Producer
- The Takedown (2022) Associate Producer
- Birds (2022) Associate Producer
- Mask Of The Devil (2022) Associate Producer
- Banish (2022) Executive Producer
- The Call (2023) Associate Producer
- Video Shop Tales Of Terror (2023) Co-Producer
- Wanderland (2023) Executive Producer
- Crossfire (2022) Executive Producer
- You People (2023) Consultant
- The Mothership (2023) Consultant
- Mosaic (2024) Associate Producer
- Blakes 7 (2024) Executive Producer
- Players In The Game (2024) Executive Producer
- Video Shop Tales Of Terror: Lust and Revenge (2024) Executive Producer
