= Lucinda Rhodes-Thakrar =

- Born: 16 September 1981 (age 44); Romford, London, England
- Other names: Lucinda Rhodes; Lucinda Rhodes-Flaherty
- Occupations: Actress, producer

Lucinda Rhodes Thakrar (born 16 September 1981) is a British television and film actress, dancer and singer. She is sometimes credited as Lucinda Rhodes or Lucinda Rhodes Flaherty in her earlier work. She is known for her work in Harry and Cosh, Cavegirl, Dream Team, Death Walks and No Reasons.

== Career ==
Rhodes Thakrar trained at the Sylvia Young Theatre School and was a part-time cheerleader for the News of the World Score Angels who performed at football matches.

Rhodes Thakrar played Cinderella in the 2005 Playhouse pantomime, and returned in 2006 to perform in the stage version of the BBC series 'Allo 'Allo!.

She is a former member of the girl group From Above. She left the band to work on KateModern.

She appeared in Harry and Cosh, Cavegirl, Morris 2274 and Dream Team. Rhodes Thakrar also appeared in one episode of My Parents Are Aliens. She played the role of Julia Van Helden in the web drama KateModern, which ended in 2008.

In 2006 she was cast as Moll in a remake which was unreleased (due to the death of producer Harry Alan Towers) of the 1996 film Moll Flanders, alongside Barry Humphries and Steven Berkoff.

Rhodes Thakrar is now CEO, with Kelly George, of KandLents, a production company which has released seven movies and produced its first big budget feature New Lake, in early 2015.

In 2014, Rhodes was cast to play the role of Sally in Spencer Hawken's 2016 film No Reasons.

== Filmography ==
- Harry and Cosh (1999–2000) (TV)
- Morris 2274 (2003) (TV)
- Cavegirl (2002–2003) (TV)
- My Parents Are Aliens (2004) (TV)
- Dream Team (2004–2005) (TV)
- KateModern (2007–2008) (TV)
- Dubplate Drama (2007–2009) (TV)
- lonelygirl15 (2008) (Web series)
- The Kid (2010) (film)
- The Fall of the Essex Boys (2012) (film)
- Dragonfly (2013) (film)
- Death Walks (2016) (film)
- No Reasons (2016) (film)
