= Romford Horror Film Festival =

Film festival

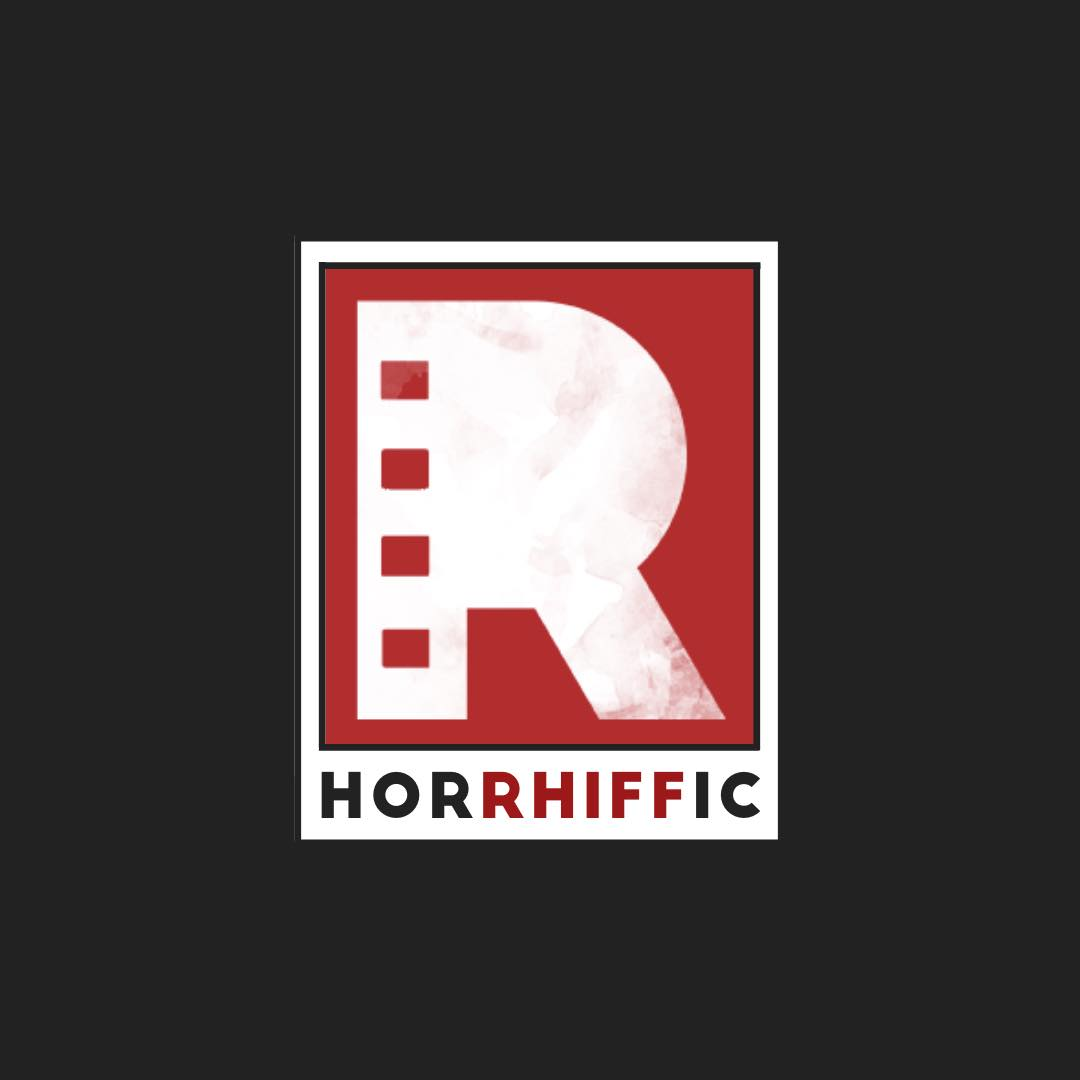
- Location: Romford, London, England
- Founded: 2020; 6 years ago
- Founded by: Spencer Hawken
- Most recent: Feb 29 - Mar 3, 2024
- Awards: 15
- Language: English
- Website: www.romfordhorrorfestival.com

Romford Horror Film Festival (a.k.a. HORRHIFFIC) is an independent horror film festival founded in 2020 by festival director Spencer Hawken. The festival takes place annually in Romford, United Kingdom and is hosted at Premiere Cinemas inside The Mercury Mall.

The festival celebrates the showcasing of the best horror independent British and International films. The festival provides a platform for established and emerging filmmakers in showcasing their work, discover new talent, and network with industry professionals. The festival also bring a variety of horror themed workshops, talks and stalls as well as giving the audience opportunities to engage with filmmakers through live Q&A's. The festival includes screenings from first-time filmmakers to some of the most established names on the independent horror film circuit with features and short films. The festival recognises the achievements of filmmakers through awards in multiple categories.

The festival has attracted a growing audience of filmmakers and industry professionals over the years including Eileen Dietz, Dani Thompson, Ayvianna Snow, Silvia Collatina, Giovanni Lombardo Radice.

== History ==
In 2020 the Romford Horror Festival announced to be taking place in summer 2021 and was taking submissions prior to the event. The festival Is developed by the festival director Spencer Hawken who also developed the Romford Film Festival.

In 2021, the 1st festival was held from 5–6 June 2021 and hosted 60 independent horror feature and short films. The festival was one of the first physical festivals in the UK post COVID-19 outbreak. As part of the festival that year Guns Akimbo was screened which starred Harry Potter's Daniel Radcliffe. It also saw Eileen Dietz introduce the special guest video introduction to 'The Exorcist: Directors Cut'. The team behind the festival that year was invited to attend Tashkent Film Festival where they were the first UK film delegation to attend.

In 2022, the 2nd festival was held from 25 to 27 February 2022 and hosted 80 independent horror feature and short films. The short film Extraneous Matter which won best short film in 2022, was reimagined into a feature film by Kenichi Ugana. The festival recorded to have had over 400 audience members during the weekend event after restrictions was lifted as part of the COVID-19 pandemic. Artists Rick Melton and Noufaux was in attendance as part of the festivals meet and greet. As part of the 2021 festival season in the previous year Manos: The Hands of Fate was screened. As part of the 2022 festival season the sequel Manos Returns was screened at the festival. The festival screened "The Ogress" a 25-minute short film. The film is inspired by serial killer Amelia Dyer, who over a thirty-year period, is believed to have killed hundreds of babies through her work as a baby farmer.

In 2023, the 3rd festival was held from 23 to 26 February 2023 and hosted 101 independent horror feature and short films over two different screens. The festival was host to local talent with a screening of feature film Videoshop Tales of Terror, largely shot at the Mercury Mall where the festival takes place. Films included international Pou as South African film and the uncanny from United States. This also saw the director Clara Gabrielle and actress Marie Laurin fly in for the event. The festival also hosted a long unseen interview with acclaimed director Lucio Fulci which was recently uncovered. As part of this screening two Italian actors who worked with the director, Silvia Collatina and Giovanni Lombardo Radice, was at the festival throughout the weekend, both did exclusive interviews with Live Q&A along with public signings for festival pass holders. In an interview with Festival Director Spencer Hawken, Collatina revealed she didn't expect to still be going places and talking about The House by the Cemetery film 40 years later. Giovanni Lombardo Radice's last public appearance was at the 2023 festival alongside Silvia Collatina.

In 2024, the 4th festival was held 29 February – 3 March 2024.

In 2025, the 5th festival will be held 28 February – 2 March 2025.

== Awards ==
The Romford Horror Film Festival recognises the achievements of filmmakers in variety of the following awards.

- Best Feature Film
- Best Short Film
- Best Director
- Best Screenplay
- Best Actor
- Best Actress
- Best Cinematography
- Best Score
- Best Visual Effects
- Best International Film
- Best Foreign Language Film
- Best Local Film
- Best Documentary Film
- Best Animated Film
- Best Anthology Film
- Best Comedy-Horror Film
- Best Film with a budget between £1,000 - £10,000
- Best Film with a budget of between £10,000 - £100,000
- Best Film Under 5 minutes
- Best Cheap Thrills
- Best Student Body Film
- Best Short Sharp Shock
- Jury Prize Award
- Alternative Awards
- Special Commendation

Key
Award Nomination
Award winner

2021 Season Nominations & Award Winners
Award	Nominee / Award Winner
Best Feature Film	Bad Candy
Best Feature Film	The Whooper Returns
Best Feature Film	VHS Forever? Once Upon A Time In Camden
Best Feature Film	Witches Of Kings Cross
Best Short Film	A Piglets Tale
Best Short Film	Blood Shed
Best Short Film	Boris In The Forest
Best Short Film	Cassette
Best Short Film	Extraneous Matter
Best Short Film	Human Trash
Best Short Film	New Woman
Best Short Film	Smiles
Best Short Film	The Cunning Man
Best Short Film	Under The Lather
Best Director	A Piglets Tale
Best Director	Bad Candy
Best Director	Black Moon
Best Director	Bloodshed
Best Director	Boris In The Forest
Best Director	Burn
Best Director	Cassette
Best Director	Human Trash
Best Director	New Woman
Best Director	Witch Of Kings Cross
Best Actor	Karlos Aurrekoetvea (Human Trash)
Best Actor	Joseph Miller (Cassette)
Best Actor	Bruno Verdoni (Bloodshed)
Best Actor	Mac McDonald (Boris In The Forest)
Best Actor	Luis Miguel Jara (Smiles)
Best Actor	Johnny Vivash (Black Mass)
Best Actor	Simon Armstrong (The Cunning Man)
Best Actor	Lysandre Robic (Under The Leather)
Best Actor	Goyo Jimenez (From Somewhere Else)
Best Actor	Tasmay (Bliss Burger)
Best Actress	Becki Pantling (The Magpie)
Best Actress	Fabienne Tournet (Black Moon)
Best Actress	Rhiannon Morgan (New Woman)
Best Actress	Megan Bolt (The Whooper Returns)
Best Actress	Kate Elizabeth Laxton (The Witch of Kings Cross)
Best Actress	Song Na Rin (The Slef-Seers)
Best Actress	Nuria Deulofeu (Polvotron 500)
Best Actress	Amanda Arcadia (Rookie Baby)
Best Actress	Merlynda Sol (The Smiling Woman)
Best Actress	Loreto S. Santamaría (Smiles)
Best Cinematography	Human Trash
Best Cinematography	New Woman
Best Cinematography	A Piglets Tale
Best Cinematography	Sleepless
Best Cinematography	Bloodshed
Best Cinematography	Bad Candy
Best Cinematography	Smiles
Best Cinematography	For Sale
Best Cinematography	The Cunning Man
Best Cinematography	Polvotron 500
Alternate Awards	Best Screenplay - Bloodshed
Alternate Awards	Best Local Film - Black Mass
Alternate Awards	Best Retro Vibe - Cassette
Alternate Awards	Best Sex Squid - Extraneous Matter
Alternate Awards	Best Low Budget Film - Leash
Alternate Awards	Best Film Shot On A Mobile Phone - The Allotment
Alternate Awards	Best Sci-Fi Horror - Human Trash
Alternate Awards	Best Documentary - The Witch Of Kings Cross
Alternate Awards	Best Cellar Dweller - For Sale
Alternate Awards	Most Colourful Death - Chromophobia

2022 Season Nominations & Award Winners
Award	Nominee / Award Winner
Best Feature Film	2.0 Lucy
Best Feature Film	Duyster
Best Feature Film	Exit
Best Feature Film	Manfish
Best Feature Film	Tales Of Creeping Death
Best Feature Film	Wyvern Hill
Best Short Film	Cutter
Best Short Film	Draining
Best Short Film	Familiar
Best Short Film	Moon Drops
Best Short Film	Transfert
Best Short Film	Visitors
Best Short Film	You Will Never Be Back
Best Director	Draining
Best Director	Familiar
Best Director	Manfish
Best Director	Moon Drops
Best Director	Transfert
Best Director	Wyvern Hill
Best Director	Monica Mateo (You Will Never Be Back)
Best Screenplay	Cutter
Best Screenplay	Duyster
Best Screenplay	Mute
Best Screenplay	Squish
Best Screenplay	Story Of An Empty Village
Best Screenplay	Superterranean
Best Screenplay	Transfert
Best Screenplay	You Will Never Be Back
Best Actor	Andrew Readman (Tales Of Creeping Death)
Best Actor	David Doukan (Transfert)
Best Actor	Dean Kilby (Manfish)
Best Actor	Hugo Nicolu (Familiar)
Best Actor	Nikola Vujovic (Moon Drops)
Best Actor	Pete Bird (Wyvern Hill)
Best Actress	Jalena Stupljanin (Moon Drops)
Best Actress	Marie Clara Cushinan (Changeling)
Best Actress	Nadia Alexander (Cutter)
Best Actress	Pat Garrett (Wyvern Hill)
Best Actress	Samantha Anderson (Off the Hook)
Best Actress	Ximena Vera (You Will Never Be Back)
Best Cinematography	Changeling
Best Cinematography	Familiar
Best Cinematography	He Murdered Sleep
Best Cinematography	Manfish
Best Cinematography	Moon Drops
Best Cinematography	Transfert
Best Cinematography	Wyvern Hill
Best Cinematography	You Will Never Be Back
Best Score	Changeling
Best Score	Draining
Best Score	Familiar
Best Score	Moon Drops
Best Score	Transfert
Best Score	Wyvern hill
Best International Film	Changeling
Best International Film	Draining
Best International Film	Duyster
Best International Film	Fractures
Best International Film	Magdalenas
Best International Film	Moon Drops
Best International Film	Transfert
Best International Film	You Will Never Be Back
Best Local Film	Doll
Best Local Film	Exit
Best Local Film	The Haunted Hall
Best Local Film	Manfish
Best Local Film	My Doll Betty
Best Local Film	Off The Hook
Best Local Film	Short Of Perfection
Best Film Under 5 Minutes	House Of The Rising Sun
Best Film Under 5 Minutes	Odds
Best Film Under 5 Minutes	Off The Hook
Best Film Under 5 Minutes	Shifter
Best Film Under 5 Minutes	Short Of Perfection
Best Film Under 5 Minutes	Wich
Best Cheap Thrill Film	Doghouse
Best Cheap Thrill Film	Doll
Best Cheap Thrill Film	Dont Open The Box
Best Cheap Thrill Film	The Haunted Hall
Best Cheap Thrill Film	My Doll Betty
Best Cheap Thrill Film	Sair Ane
Jury Prize Award	Believe
Jury Prize Award	Belfast 1912
Jury Prize Award	Extraneous Matter Complete Edition
Jury Prize Award	He Murdered sleep
Jury Prize Award	Odds
Jury Prize Award	The witches Bargin
Alternate Awards	Best Animated Short - House Of The Rising Sun
Alternate Awards	Best Chainsaw Death - Visitors
Alternate Awards	Best Folk Horror - Changeling
Alternate Awards	Best Found Footage - Duyster
Alternate Awards	Best Lockdown Film - Sair Ane
Alternate Awards	Most Horrific Househare - Doghouse
Alternate Awards	Most Horrific Bath Time - That Old Misery

2023 Season Nominations & Award Winners
Award	Nominee / Award Winner
Best Feature Film	A Life On The Farm
Best Feature Film	Feed Me
Best Feature Film	Eating Miss Campbell
Best Feature Film	The Creeping
Best Feature Film	Walking Against The Rain
Best Feature Film	You
Best Short Film	665
Best Short Film	Creulon
Best Short Film	Incubus
Best Short Film	Kiddo
Best Short Film	Solus
Best Short Film	Sonar
Best Short Film	Type Till You Bleed
Best Director	Alan Dunne (Family Night)
Best Director	Jamie Hooper (The Creeping)
Best Director	Tito Fernandes (Incubus)
Best Director	Jaco Minnaar (Pou)
Best Director	Richard Jackson (Type Till You Bleed)
Best Director	Adam Leader and Richard Oaks (Feed Me)
Best Screenplay	Dispensary Of Death
Best Screenplay	Eating Miss Cambell
Best Screenplay	Feed Me
Best Screenplay	Kiddo
Best Screenplay	The Creeping
Best Screenplay	The Ones You Didn't Burn
Best Actor	Charles Carson (A Life On The Farm)
Best Actor	Eoin Quinn (Family Night)
Best Actor	Gabin Kongolo (Creulon)
Best Actor	Neil Ward (Feed Me)
Best Actor	Paddy Stafford (Kiddo)
Best Actor	Patrick Mc Gee (The Wait In The Dark)
Best Actress	Riann Steele (The Creeping)
Best Actress	Lisa Howard (Kiddo)
Best Actress	Malou Coindreau (Incubus)
Best Actress	Niamh Branigan (Dispensary Of Death)
Best Actress	Marie Laurin (The Uncanny)
Best Actress	Tarryn Wyngaard (POU)
Best Cinematography	Creulon
Best Cinematography	Feed Me
Best Cinematography	For The Love Of The Craft
Best Cinematography	Pou
Best Cinematography	Sonar
Best Cinematography	The Creeping
Best Score	665
Best Score	Creulon
Best Score	Feed Me
Best Score	Pou
Best Score	Sonar
Best Score	The Creeping
Best International Film	Anthropophagous 2
Best International Film	Colonie
Best International Film	Diversions (Politics Of)
Best International Film	Incubus
Best International Film	Newcomer
Best International Film	Twist
Best Local Film	Horror-Scopes
Best Local Film	Room 301
Best Local Film	See What She Did
Best Local Film	Videoshop Tales Of Terror
Best Local Film	Walking Against The Rain
Best Documentary Film	Fulci Talks
Best Documentary Film	A Life On The Farm
Best Film Under 5 Minutes	Caregiver
Best Film Under 5 Minutes	Demon In The Bottle
Best Film Under 5 Minutes	Floor 43
Best Film Under 5 Minutes	The Witching Hour
Best Film Under 5 Minutes	Tummyache
Best Film Under 5 Minutes	Unveiled
Best Cheap Thrill Film	A Real Pair
Best Cheap Thrill Film	All The Music You Need
Best Cheap Thrill Film	All You Can Eat
Best Cheap Thrill Film	Amber
Best Cheap Thrill Film	Serial Killer
Best Cheap Thrill Film	Tatties
Jury Prize Award	Kiddo
Jury Prize Award	Video Shop Tales Of Terror
Jury Prize Award	Eating Miss Campbell
Jury Prize Award	Type Till You Bleed
Jury Prize Award	The Uncanny
Jury Prize Award	Serialkiller
Alternate Awards	Best Dildo Death - Kemal Yildirim
Alternate Awards	Best Killer Puppet - Simon
Alternate Awards	Most Sprising Death - Strings
Alternate Awards	Aesthetic of HORRIFIC 2023 - Creulon
Alternate Awards	Best One Liner - The Iron Sheik Massacre
Alternate Awards	Best Young Film Maker - Morto Rossa

2024 Season Nominations & Award Winners
Award	Nominee / Award Winner
Best Feature Film	He Never Left
Best Feature Film	How to Kill Monsters
Best Feature Film	Just One Last Thing
Best Feature Film	Lore
Best Feature Film	Visitors - Complete Edition
Best Feature Film	Voice of Shadows
Best Short Film	Bisected
Best Short Film	Caretaker
Best Short Film	Kin
Best Short Film	Old Flames
Best Short Film	Spiral to the Center
Best Short Film	Trial 22
Best Director	Danny Pineros – (Bisected)
Best Director	James Hood – (Caretaker)
Best Director	James Morris – (He Never Left)
Best Director	Stewart Sparke – (How to Kill Monsters)
Best Director	James Waterhouse – (Kin)
Best Director	Kenichi Ugana - (Visitors: Complete Edition)
Best Director	Nicholas Bain – (Voice of Shadows)
Best Screenplay	Caretaker
Best Screenplay	Just One Last Thing
Best Screenplay	Knock, Knock, (Knock)
Best Screenplay	Sandra Gets A New Fringe
Best Screenplay	Vestige
Best Screenplay	Marvin the Vampire
Best Actor	Colin Cunningham (He Never Left)
Best Actor	Graham Cole (Pareidolia)
Best Actor	Johnny Vivash (Isaac)
Best Actor	Oliver Asante (Caterpillar)
Best Actor	Richard Brake (Lore)
Best Actor	Tony Todd (The Activated Man)
Best Actress	Diane Franklin (Pareidolia)
Best Actress	Caroline Burns-Cooke (Just One Last Thing)
Best Actress	Lauren Okadigbo (Kin)
Best Actress	Lyndsey Craine (How to Kill Monsters)
Best Actress	Maud Wyler (Mantra)
Best Actress	Sean Young (The Activated Man)
Best Cinematography	Bisected
Best Cinematography	Caretaker
Best Cinematography	Edward Has A Tree Inside Him
Best Cinematography	Manicure
Best Cinematography	Trial 22
Best Score	Behave
Best Score	He Never Left
Best Score	How to Kill Monsters
Best Score	Mantra
Best Score	The Activated Man
Best Score	The Slave and the Sorcerer
Best Score	Trial 22
Best Visual Effects	Bisected
Best Visual Effects	Escalation
Best Visual Effects	How to Kill Monsters
Best Visual Effects	Promin'
Best Visual Effects	The Slave and the Sorcerer
Best Visual Effects	The Pocket Film of Superstitions
Best Visual Effects	Visitors - Complete Edition
Best Foreign Language Film	Escalation
Best Foreign Language Film	Mantra
Best Foreign Language Film	Parallel Universes: The Sequel
Best Foreign Language Film	Stage Fright
Best Foreign Language Film	The Pencil
Best Foreign Language Film	Visitors - Complete Edition
Best Local Film	Buckett's Brand New Bar
Best Local Film	Isaac
Best Local Film	Mosaic
Best Local Film	Sour Milk
Best Animated Film	Chef Gustav
Best Animated Film	The Blood On Me
Best Animated Film	The Curse of Frankenbite
Best Animated Film	The Watching
Best Animated Film	Under the Bed
Best Anthology Film	Dean of the Dead's Holiday Horrors
Best Anthology Film	Horrorscopes 2: Chinese Zodiac
Best Anthology Film	Lore
Best Anthology Film	Mosaic
Best Anthology Film	Pocket Film of Superstitions
Best Comedy-Horror Film	Chef Gustav
Best Comedy-Horror Film	Collection Only
Best Comedy-Horror Film	Curse of Frankenbite
Best Comedy-Horror Film	Free Spirits
Best Comedy-Horror Film	Knock, Knock, (Knock)
Best Comedy-Horror Film	Marvin the Vampire
Best Film with a budget between £1,000 - £10,000	Bisected
Best Film with a budget between £1,000 - £10,000	Caterpillar
Best Film with a budget between £1,000 - £10,000	Kin
Best Film with a budget between £1,000 - £10,000	Trial 22
Best Film with a budget between £1,000 - £10,000	Watch Me Sleep
Best Film with a budget of between £10,000 - £100,000	Caretaker
Best Film with a budget of between £10,000 - £100,000	Haunted Ulster Live
Best Film with a budget of between £10,000 - £100,000	He Never Left
Best Film with a budget of between £10,000 - £100,000	Just One Last Thing
Best Film with a budget of between £10,000 - £100,000	Lore
Best Film with a budget of between £10,000 - £100,000	Old Flames
Best Film with a budget of between £10,000 - £100,000	Vestige
Best Cheap Thrills Film	Curse of Frankenbite
Best Cheap Thrills Film	Edward Has A Tree Inside Him
Best Cheap Thrills Film	Knock, Knock, (Knock)
Best Cheap Thrills Film	The Blood on Me
Best Cheap Thrills Film	The Pencil
Best Cheap Thrills Film	The Vulture
Best Student Body Film	Hold of the Dead
Best Student Body Film	I Love Your Knife
Best Student Body Film	The Watching
Best Student Body Film	Trick or Treat
Short Sharp Shocks	Chef Gustav
Short Sharp Shocks	Girl in the Dark
Short Sharp Shocks	Heart Breaker
Short Sharp Shocks	Old Flames
Short Sharp Shocks	Skinny Dip
Short Sharp Shocks	Stranger Danger
Short Sharp Shocks	Wolf Whistle
Jury Prize Award	Bisected
Jury Prize Award	Caterpillar
Jury Prize Award	Edward Has A Tree Inside Him
Jury Prize Award	He Never Left
Jury Prize Award	Kin
Jury Prize Award	Mantra
Special Commendation	Best Fantasy Film - The Slave and the Sorcerer
Special Commendation	Best Portrayal of Women in Horror - Just One Last Thing
Special Commendation	Most Promising Filmmaker - Remi Amber Danielle Tees
Special Commendation	Most Inventive Film - Spiral to the Center
Horror Roulette	Gold Award - Unami
Horror Roulette	Silver Award - Become
Horror Roulette	Bronze Award - Monsters

2025 Season Nominations & Award Winners
Award	Nominee / Award Winner
Best Feature Film	All This Time
Best Feature Film	Never Have I Ever
Best Feature Film	Take From Me
Best Feature Film	The Cellar
Best Feature Film	The Crucifix: Blood of the Exorcist
Best Feature Film	Welcome to Kittytown
Best Short Film	Body Worn Video
Best Short Film	Grandma, May I
Best Short Film	Hallowed
Best Short Film	House Hunters
Best Short Film	Primacy
Best Short Film	Red Diamond Cut
Best Director (Feature Film)	Douglas James Luciuk (Welcome to Kittytown)
Best Director (Feature Film)	Justin Best (Sheryl)
Best Director (Feature Film)	Rachel Cain (Somnium)
Best Director (Feature Film)	Rob Worsey (All This Time)
Best Director (Feature Film)	West Elridge (Take From Me)
Best Director (Short Film)	Adrian Leon (Night Whispers)
Best Director (Short Film)	David Yorke (Nervous Ellie)
Best Director (Short Film)	Ed Kirk (Black Dog)
Best Director (Short Film)	John Ferrer (1 Star Review)
Best Director (Short Film)	Lisa Soper (Have a Good Day)
Best Director (Short Film)	Olivia J Loader (Hallowed)
Best Screenplay (Feature Film)	All This Time
Best Screenplay (Feature Film)	Halloween Tales
Best Screenplay (Feature Film)	Psychopomp
Best Screenplay (Feature Film)	Sheryl
Best Screenplay (Feature Film)	Take From Me
Best Screenplay (Feature Film)	Welcome to Kittytown
Best Screenplay (Short Film)	Angus Gets Ghosted
Best Screenplay (Short Film)	Have a Good Day
Best Screenplay (Short Film)	Housebreaker
Best Screenplay (Short Film)	House Hunters
Best Screenplay (Short Film)	Killer In The House
Best Screenplay (Short Film)	The Once-Trust
Best Actor	Andrew Lee Potts (Never Have I Ever)
Best Actor	Bob Barrett (Joker: The Last Laugh)
Best Actor	Dan De Bourgh (All This Time)
Best Actor	Darren Zimmer (Welcome to Kittytown)
Best Actor	Ethan McDowell (Take From Me)
Best Actress	Caroline Quigley (The Red Hourglass)
Best Actress	Dodie Finamore (Surprise!)
Best Actress	Kelsey Cooke (Nervous Ellie)
Best Actress	Megan Adara (The Cellar)
Best Actress	Megan Tremethick (The Reign of Queen Ginnarra)
Best Actress	Emily Rose Holt (All This Time)
Best Cinematography	All This Time
Best Cinematography	Body Worn Video
Best Cinematography	Seed of Doubt
Best Cinematography	Take From Me
Best Cinematography	The Reign of Queen Ginnarra
Best Cinematography	Welcome to Kittytown
Best Score	Backmask
Best Score	Black Dog
Best Score	Eximo
Best Score	Grandma, May I
Best Score	Progeny
Best Score	VHX
Best Special Effects	Eximo
Best Special Effects	Halloween Tales
Best Special Effects	Ingest
Best Special Effects	The Neighbourhood at the End of the World
Best Special Effects	The Reign of Queen Ginnarra
Best Foreign Film	Halloween Tales
Best Foreign Film	Primacy
Best Foreign Film	Selfie
Best Foreign Film	Stendhal
Best Foreign Film	The Beast
Best Foreign Film	The Bomb
Best Local Film	Britain's Greatest Ghost Stories
Best Local Film	Simon Says
Best Local Film	Surprise!
Best Local Film	The Domestication of Vampires in Essex
Best Local Film	Video Shop Tales of Terror 2: Lust and Revenge
Best Animated Film	Mattricide
Best Animated Film	Moving Parts
Best Animated Film	To The Brink
Best Animated Film	VHX
Best Anthology Film	Halloween Tales
Best Anthology Film	Horrorscopes Volume 3: Dark Zodiac
Best Anthology Film	Video Shop Tales of Terror 2: Lust and Revenge
Best Anthology Film	Virus Detected
Best Cheap Thrills	Ingest
Best Cheap Thrills	My Gray Face
Best Cheap Thrills	Night Whispers
Best Cheap Thrills	Reaching Out
Best Cheap Thrills	Struck
Best Cheap Thrills	To The Brink
Best Short Under 5 Minutes	Cereal
Best Short Under 5 Minutes	Hereafter
Best Short Under 5 Minutes	Housebreaker
Best Short Under 5 Minutes	The Milk Situation
Best Short Under 5 Minutes	Moving Parts
Best Short Under 5 Minutes	To The Brink
Best Low Budget (Feature Film)	Britain's Greatest Ghost Stories
Best Low Budget (Feature Film)	Everyone is Going to Die
Best Low Budget (Feature Film)	Interlopers
Best Low Budget (Feature Film)	Members Club
Best Low Budget (Feature Film)	Never Have I Ever
Best Low Budget (Short Film)	Black Dog
Best Low Budget (Short Film)	Hallowed
Best Low Budget (Short Film)	House Hunters
Best Low Budget (Short Film)	Joker: The Last Laugh
Best Low Budget (Short Film)	Night Whispers
Best Low Budget (Short Film)	Seed of Doubt
Best Editing	All This Time
Best Editing	Another Alice
Best Editing	Body Worn Video
Best Editing	Everyone is Going to Die
Best Editing	Selfie
Best Editing	The Protos Experiment
Best Ensemble Cast	All This Time
Best Ensemble Cast	Backmask
Best Ensemble Cast	Joker: The Last Laugh
Best Ensemble Cast	Members Club
Best Ensemble Cast	Staycation
Best Ensemble Cast	Welcome to Kittytown
Jury Prize Award	Halloween Tales
Peoples Choice Awards	Best Short Film - The Domestication of Vampires in Essex
Peoples Choice Awards	Best Feature Film - Psychopomp
Peoples Choice Awards	Best Actor - Andrew Lee Potts
Peoples Choice Awards	Best Actress - Amber Doig-Thorne
Lifetime Achievement Award	Outstanding Contribution to Film - Steven Berkoff
Alternative Awards	Funniest Moment - "Nonce Uncle" from Video Shop Tales of Terror 2: Lust and Revenge
Alternative Awards	Worst Death - Shiver Me Timbers

== Official selection ==
2021 Season (5–6 June 2021)
Project	Director(s)	Runtime	Type	Country
Bloodshed	Paolo Mancin, Daniel Watchorn	12:37	Short	Canada
From Somewhere Else	Bruno Marín	20:00	Short	Spain
Human Trash	Aitor Almuedo	16:38	Short	Spain
Polvotron 500	Silvia Conesa	11:00	Short	Spain
Smiles	Javier Chavanel	13:25	Short	Spain
Adam In Aeternum	Pedro Jaen R.	14:55	Short	Spain
Fraternalings	Liam Parry	17:31	Short	United States
SEEDS	Skip Shea	01:30:00	Feature	United States
The Boston Maniac	Judson Vaughan	4:30	Short	United Kingdom
BURN	Judson Vaughan	15:00	Short	United Kingdom
The Sleepless	Kami Sadraei	7:08	Short	United States
Long Pig	Riccardo Suriano	8:30	Short	Italy
Cold Caller	Darren J. Perry	10:00	Short	United Kingdom
VHS Forever? Once Upon A Time in Camden	Mark Williams	01:44:06	Feature	United Kingdom
Kid Nap	Gurkan Yaman	1:00	Short	United Kingdom
Chromophobia	Mark Lediard, Gavin Williams	12:06	Short	United Kingdom
The Mime	Mark Lediard, Gavin Williams	2:20	Short	United Kingdom
The House at the End	Neil Harget	5:09	Short	United Kingdom
The Whooper Returns	Samuel Krebs	01:11:42	Feature	United States
The Magpie	Oliver Steele	8:33	Short	United Kingdom
The Penny Dropped	A D Cooper	5:47	Short	United Kingdom
Malingee	Felix Lovell	6:42	Short	Australia
Elevaterror	Lee Charlish	3:40	Short	United Kingdom
For Sale	Francesco Gabriele	15:00	Short	United Kingdom
Extraneous Matter	Kenichi Ugana	21:59	Short	Japan
Midnight Movie : Magnum Opus	Myriam Khammassi	12:48	Short	Tunisia
Bliss Burger	Adam Wright	20:11	Short	United States
Testimony	James Peaty	8:15	Short	United Kingdom
Tangle	M. Noe	14:11	Short	Myanmar
Smiling Woman	Alex Magaña	2:44	Short	United States
Outbreak	Alex Magaña	3:25	Short	United States
Worm	Ilya Polyakov	9:12	Short	United States
Cassette	Ilya Polyakov	8:09	Short	United States
Cutstein	Hamidreza Khosh-Bazan	10:47	Short	United Kingdom
Snakeskin	Wesley Clapp	18:24	Short	United States
Bad Candy (2021)	Scott Hansen, Desiree Connell	01:42:00	Feature	United States
Boris In The Forest	Robert Hackett	12:00	Short	United Kingdom
Honor Among Thieves	Justin Eugene Evans	9:59	Short	United States
The Tell-Tale Heart - a musicabre	Danny Ashkenasi	37:42	Short	United States
La Selfille	Jérémy Brondoni	7:55	Short	France
Dream State	John Aldridge	4:00	Short	United Kingdom
Darker, Darkest	Jerome Velinsky	14:30	Short	Australia
A Piglet's Tale	Fabrizio Gammardella	12:30	Short	United Kingdom
She Of The Land	Gary J Hewitt	15:00	Short	United Kingdom
New Woman	Benjamin Noah	19:52	Short	Canada
The Case of Katelyn Burns	Toyah Frantzen	10:40	Short	United Kingdom
Love In Vein	Phillip Brown	14:47	Short	United Kingdom
Parka	Marcella Cortland, Alrik Bursell	7:05	Short	United States
ROOKIE BABY	Tony Báez Milán	10:17	Short	United States
What You Can't See	Chris Richardson	14:18	Short	United Kingdom
Haunting the Haunted	John Gigrich	6:05	Short	United States
The Self-Seers	Matthew David Ridley	10:00	Short	South Korea
Wicca Book	Vahagn Karapetyan	22:46	Short	Greece
Bogey	Iolo Edwards	10:13	Short	United Kingdom
Rueful Warrior	Mark Owen	14:51	Short	United Kingdom
GRACE	Konstantin Egerndorfer	40:00	Short	Germany
Dandelions	Jason Cherot	4:54	Short	United Kingdom
Under the lather	Ollivier Briand	13:57	Short	France
The Witch of Kings Cross	Sonia Bible	01:15:13	Feature	Australia
The Cunning Man	Zoë Dobson	12:54	Short	United Kingdom
THE BOX	Christopher Cook	13:00	Short	United Kingdom
Daytime Nightmare	Katrina Grey	01:25:00	Feature	United Kingdom
UNREGISTERED	Sophia Banks	15:00	Short	United States
Black Mass	Scott Lyus	11:40	Short	United Kingdom
Define Delphine	Fábio Brandão	29:36	Short	Brazil
Black Moon	Ryan Graff	8:10	Short	United States
The Allotment	Alexander Churchyard, Michael Holiday	5:15	Short	United Kingdom
LEASH	Jamie Thornham	7:53	Short	United Kingdom

2022 Season (24–27 February 2022)
Project	Director(s)	Runtime	Type	Country
The Ogress	Jon Kent	25:00	Short	United Kingdom
Doll	Louis Taylor	11:47	Short	United Kingdom
Doghouse	Anabel kutay	19:30	Short	United Kingdom
Believe	Peter Stead	13:47	Short	United Kingdom
Sugar Lumps	Adrian Scott	5:09	Short	United Kingdom
The Haunted Hall	Daniel Attrill	8:51	Short	United Kingdom
Transfert	Jonathan Degrelle	13:15	Short	France
ManFish	Marc Coleman	01:25:00	Feature	United Kingdom
Changeling	Marie Clare Cushinan, Ryan O'Neill	25:08	Short	Ireland
Valley of the Shadow: The Spiritual Value of Horror	Tyler Smith	02:20:47	Feature	United States
Duyster	Thomas Vanbrabant, Jordi Ostir	01:20:00	Feature	Belgium
Iku-Tiera	Tuomo Mäntynen	10:49	Short	Finland
SQUISH	Xavier SERON	20:00	Short	Belgium
Belfast 1912	Dominic O'Neill	11:00	Short	United Kingdom
Off The Hook	Daniel Keeble	4:13	Short	United Kingdom
LARVA	Arik Bauriedl	15:00	Short	Germany
He Murdered Sleep	Jeremy Boxen	20:00	Short	Canada
Ruthless	Owen Franklin	01:23:42	Feature	United Kingdom
Odds	A. D. Cooper	3:12	Short	United Kingdom
Dragon Blue	Grant Dominguez	10:00	Short	United States
MASK	Boyuan Liu	6:55	Short	United Kingdom
Haunted Thrills	Mike Lyddon	25:00	Short	United States
Euthimmersia	Steven Lancefield	16:05	Short	United Kingdom
Tales Of The Creeping Death	John Williams	01:35:51	Feature	United Kingdom
Strings	Caitlin Ellen Richardson	12:50	Short	United Kingdom
Relict	Ilya Polyakov	8:03	Short	United States
Wyvern Hill	Jonathan Zaurin	01:48:50	Feature	United Kingdom
Shifter	Robin Stjernberg, Joel Eklund	4:33	Short	Sweden
Ghosts	Dominique Rochon	7:00	Short	Canada
Enchanted	Andrea R Ciobanu	6:00	Short	United Kingdom
Vox Furem	William Horsefield	11:25	Short	United Kingdom
Z Investigation	Daniel Brener	10:00	Short	Israel
My Doll Betty	Tonks Blom	10:00	Short	United Kingdom
The Gloom	Dani Viqueira	13:47	Short	Spain
Story of an Empty Village	Jorge Tudanca García	25:00	Short	Spain
Magdalenas	José Miguel Santacreu Cortés	9:51	Short	Spain
Fractures	Fernando Tato	13:00	Short	Spain
You will never be back	Mónica Mateo	13:35	Short	Spain
Echoes	Zak Harney	2:33	Short	United Kingdom
Sair Ane	Ian Gordon	29:05	Short	United Kingdom
Superterranean	Ian Gordon	01:43:27	Feature	United Kingdom
The Tick	Massimo Poli	7:17	Short	United Kingdom
Friend	Kelly Smith	26:55	Short	United Kingdom
Mute	Kyle Dunbar	22:48	Short	Canada
The Witch's Bargain	Corey J. Trahan	29:59	Short	United States
Familiar	David J. Ellison	10:00	Short	United Kingdom
That Old Misery	Gray Creasy	17:22	Short	United States
Draining	Guillaume Chevalier	17:22	Short	France
Momma, Don't Go	Rafael De Leon Jr.	5:32	Short	United States
Reflection	Andrian Gurghis	13:45	Short	United Kingdom
Visitors	Kenichi Ugana	16:20	Short	Japan
11PM	JP Thomson	29:57	Short	United Kingdom
The Hangman	Edoardo Magliarella	3:41	Short	Italy
The Warehouse	Lee Daehan	18:13	Short	South Korea
Split	Richard Anthony Dunford	9:49	Short	United Kingdom
Wich	Anthony Williams	4:37	Short	United States
2.0 LUCY	Fenella Greenfield	01:34:28	Feature	United Kingdom
Redwood	Max Roach, Joe Schofield	16:21	Short	United Kingdom
Anguane	Luca Bertossi	16:47	Short	Italy
Don't Open the Box	Joe Duncombe	5:28	Short	United Kingdom
Cutter	Dan Repp, Lindsay Young	15:37	Short	United States
EXIT	Michael Fausti	01:20:34	Feature	United Kingdom
Short Of Perfection	Max Roach	2:28	Short	United Kingdom
Moon Drops	Yoram Ever-Hadani	16:00	Short	Israel
Horizon	Daniele De Muro	15:00	Short	Italy
The House of The Rising Sun	Connor Gerald	2:02	Short	Canada

2023 Season (23–26 February 2023)
Project	Director(s)	Runtime	Type	Country
Tummyache	Kieran Stringfellow, Tasha Williams	4:20	Short	United Kingdom
THE BLACK reCAT	Paolo Gaudio	5:44	Short	Italy
Spellbound	Robin Rippmann	10:51	Short	Switzerland
Video Shop Tales of Terror	Alexander Churchyard, Michael Fausti, Tom Lee Rutter, Sam Mason Bell, MJ Dixon, Andrew Elias, Geoff Harmer, Tony Mardon	01:56:55	Feature	United Kingdom
Serurta	Steven Lyons	42:00	Short	United Kingdom
Virgil	Christopher Stevens	9:02	Short	United States
MERGER	Daniel Negret	7:45	Short	United Kingdom
Kiddo	Brett Chapman	14:57	Short	United Kingdom
We Are Final Girls	Carrie Kendall	19:59	Short	United Kingdom
THE UNCANNY	Clara Gabrielle	01:46:49	Feature	United States
See What She Did	Daniel Keeble	7:36	Short	United Kingdom
Inseparable	Samuel Greco	13:57	Short	United Kingdom
Viral	Tristan Shepherd	36:30	Short	United Kingdom
A Real Pair	Ed Willey	6:15	Short	United Kingdom
Unreel	C.I. Smith	7:13	Short	United Kingdom
The Devil's Hideout	Marc Carreté	01:26:00	Feature	Spain
Creulon	Kyran Davies	6:20	Short	United Kingdom
Diversion (Politics of)	Simon Heymans	17:00	Short	Belgium
For The Love Of The Craft	Callum Laurence, Albert Hilditch-Crimes	11:41	Short	United Kingdom
Morto Rossa	Yan Berthemy	10:00	Short	France
La Nueva (The Newcomer)	Ivan Villamel	15:00	Short	Spain
Puppet Killer	Lisa Ovies	01:23:15	Feature	Canada
Darker	Frank van den Bogaart	14:45	Short	Belgium
Walking Against the Rain	Scott Lyus	01:34:00	Feature	United Kingdom
THE IRON SHEIK MASSACRE	John Hennigan	23:50	Short	United States
Strings	Rodrigo Rodrigo Moreno	13:00	Short	United States
The Fallen Woman	Kelly Smith	29:40	Short	United Kingdom
ROOM 301	Darren Kent	6:29	Short	United Kingdom
SONAR	James Hughes	6:26	Short	United Kingdom
Amber	Sashia Dumont	5:39	Short	United States
Tealight	Matt Taylor	23:01	Short	United Kingdom
Feed Me	Adam Leader, Richard Oakes	01:36:16	Feature	United Kingdom
A Life On The Farm	Oscar Harding	01:15:00	Feature	United Kingdom
Floor 43	Sophya Kebets	3:03	Short	United Kingdom
TATTIES	Jon Robertson, Chris Cameron	13:49	Short	United Kingdom
It Got Bloody	Juan Antonio Rotunno	3:37	Short	Mexico
Type Till You Bleed	Richard Jackson	21:46	Short	United Kingdom
Horror-Scopes	MJ Dixon, Tony Sands, Maria Lee Metheringham, Pablo Raybould, Dani Thompson, Richard Elson, Davin Jeayes, Luna Wolf, Tony Marden, Martin W Payne, Annie Knox, Alex Churchyard	01:28:00	Feature	United Kingdom
All You Can Eat	Kieran Reed	12:00	Short	United Kingdom
A Hymn For Her	Emma Pitt	8:57	Short	United Kingdom
The Witching Hour	Abigail Brenker	3:53	Short	United States
The Mean Spirited	Joseph Archer, Jack Archer	14:55	Short	United Kingdom
INCUBUS	Tito Fernandes	16:45	Short	United Kingdom
The Haunting of the Lady-Jane	Kemal Yildirim	01:37:37	Feature	United Kingdom
Colonie	Romain Daudet-Jahan	13:14	Short	France
Family Night	Alan Dunne	17:17	Short	Ireland
Two Sisters	Diego Carli	21:43	Short	Italy
Fear Abides, Nightly Glistens	Mark Solter	12:00	Short	United States
Demon in the Bottle	Evan Preston	3:10	Short	United Kingdom
Eating Miss Campbell	Liam Regan	01:24:00	Feature	United Kingdom
The Microscope	Elliot Vick, Reuben Vick	10:16	Short	United Kingdom
The Creeping	Jamie Hooper	01:34:00	Feature	United Kingdom
POU (PEACOCK)	Jaco Minnaar	01:29:00	Feature	South Africa
Where's Weirdo	Duncan Peake	8:50	Short	Australia
Mask of the Devil	Richard Rowntree	01:28:10	Feature	United Kingdom
Solus	Jonathan Brooks	12:45	Short	United Kingdom
Twist	Kenichi Ugana	12:48	Short	Japan
Tales from the Great War	Andrew Elias	01:03:02	Feature	United Kingdom
All the Music You Need	James Fox	9:11	Short	United Kingdom
Dispensary of Death	Simon O'Neill	14:17	Short	Ireland
Cyanide	John Ferrer	6:15	Short	United Kingdom
Serialkiller (Serienkiller)	Dwight Darko	7:42	Short	Germany
THE MASTERPIECE	Lee Daehan	29:05	Short	South Korea
Unveiled	Ryan Graff	2:06	Short	United States
Part Forever	Chung-An Ou Alan	12:33	Short	Taiwan
AGATHA	Roland Becerra, Kelly Bigelow Becerra	01:00:00	Feature	United States
SCRIPT	Piero Cannata	8:10	Short	Italy
Baby Monitor	Stefan Parker	5:10	Short	United Kingdom
O	Dominik Balkow	14:29	Short	Germany
Writers' Retreat	Mishaal Memon	29:22	Short	United Kingdom
Last Orders	Jon James Smith	21:05	Short	United Kingdom
Caregiver	Rafael De Leon	5:00	Short	United States
Dead Bride	Francesco Picone	01:23:00	Feature	Italy
The Hand That Feeds You	John Perivolaris	10:40	Short	United Kingdom
665	Juan De Dios Garduño	9:59	Short	Spain

2024 Season (29 February - 3 March 2024)
Project	Director(s)	Runtime	Type	Country
Newsgrid	Chris Harvey	7:04	Short Film	United Kingdom
Sunday Driver	Mark Lawrence	11:00	Short Film	United Kingdom
The Slave and the Sorcerer	Lawrie Brewster	01:25:00	Feature Film	United Kingdom
Mosaic	Alexander Churchyard, Michael Holiday	01:50:00	Feature Film	United Kingdom
Life After (2024, 8 mins)	Martin W Payne	8:00	Short Film	United Kingdom
Peter Rabid	SJ Evans	01:18:00	Feature Film	United Kingdom
Neonate	Georgie Kerssenbrock	10:36	Short Film	United Kingdom
JUST ONE LAST THING	Alexandra Gillespie	01:39:22	Feature Film	United Kingdom
I Won't Be Long, Love	James Fox	9:22	Short Film	United Kingdom
KIN	James Waterhouse	8:00	Short Film	United Kingdom
The Man with My Name	Simon O'Neill	26:18	Short Film	Ireland
Voice of Shadows	Nicholas Bain	01:30:00	Feature Film	United States
Taped Up Memories	Jackson Batchelor, Sam Mason Bell	60:00	Feature Film	United Kingdom
Taped Up Families	S N Sibley	01:10:00	Feature Film	United Kingdom
Under The Bed	Jeremy Sladdin	1:00	Short Film	United Kingdom
Collection Only	Alun Rhys Morgan	12:00	Short Film	United Kingdom
Parallel Universes: The sequel	Natanael Cardona Sánchez	9:00	Short Film	Spain
RoButler	James Button	5:37	Short Film	United Kingdom
Haunted Ulster Live	Dominic O'Neill	01:18:00	Feature Film	United Kingdom
The Vice	Jon Kent	10:04	Short Film	United Kingdom
CYCLES	Will Darbyshire	14:25	Short Film	United Kingdom
Free Spirits	George Moore	26:31	Short Film	United Kingdom
PULP	Theo Beaudean	15:59	Short Film	France
Sauvage (English subs)	Ornella Barbé	20:00	Short Film	France
STAGE FRIGHT	Alexandre Leroy	28:39	Short Film	France
HORROR-SCOPES : CHINESE ZODIAC	Domonic Brunt, Dani Thompson, MJ Dixon, Tony Sands	01:33:00	Feature Film	United Kingdom
SLASHER HOUS3 : REBOOTED	MJ Dixon	01:55:00	Feature Film	United Kingdom
SOMNIA CORVUS	Stevie Alexandria Maxwell, Paul Van Beaumont	16:56	Short Film	United Kingdom
The Auteur	Bethany White	9:29	Short Film	United Kingdom
The Blood On Me	Guy Harvey	11:25	Short Film	United Kingdom
The Foreboding: Fractured (Short Film)	Kemal Yildirim	26:56	Short Film	United Kingdom
Sandra Gets A New Fringe	Michael Beddoes, Penelope Yeulet	9:20	Short Film	United Kingdom
It's Fine	Alla Eliseeva	11:00	Short Film	Russia
Remember Me 2: Forget Me Not	Steven M. Smith	01:24:46	Feature Film	United Kingdom
Sour Milk	Joe Duncombe	18:24	Short Film	United Kingdom
Dolly Molly's Playhouse	Joe Duncombe	3:35	Short Film	United Kingdom
Caterpillar	Matt Bentley-Viney	14:00	Short Film	United Kingdom
Stockholm By Night	Tobias Moe	9:32	Short Film	Sweden
Stranger Danger	A D Cooper	3:30	Short Film	United Kingdom
The Vulture	Jason Balas	5:55	Short Film	United States
Shipwreck	Artem Zaitsev	8:00	Short Film	Spain
Bisected	Danny Pineros	7:43	Short Film	United States
Chef Gustav	Luke Frangeskou	2:56	Short Film	United Kingdom
Hold of the Dead	Charlie Langford	4:59	Short Film	United Kingdom
NZU	Conscian Morgan	8:26	Short Film	United States
Jacques the Mimic	Richard Anthony Dunford	8:57	Short Film	United Kingdom
NAP	Javier Chavanel	14:00	Short Film	Spain
He Never Left	James Morris	01:33:35	Feature Film	United States
The Hangman	Cameron Sun	6:49	Short Film	United States
The Activated Man	Nicholas Gyeney	01:55:00	Feature Film	United States
Isaac	Tariq Sayed	01:24:00	Feature Film	United Kingdom
Help Point	Anabella Forbes	5:29	Short Film	United Kingdom
Rain, Rain, Go Away	Sebastiano Pupino	13:05	Short Film	United Kingdom
The Ceremony	Connor Hall	8:50	Short Film	United Kingdom
FISTER	Anthony Moran	15:59	Short Film	United Kingdom
How to Kill Monsters	Stewart Sparke	01:36:00	Feature Film	United Kingdom
Sleep Tight	Lisa Ovies	14:15	Short Film	Canada
Bad Boy Buck	James Fitzgerald	21:33	Short Film	Ireland
The Darkling Fox	Henry Fish	8:29	Short Film	United Kingdom
Dean of the Dead's Holiday Horrors!	Dean Sharp	01:18:59	Feature Film	United Kingdom
The Pocket Film Of Superstitions	Tom Lee Rutter	01:28:08	Feature Film	United Kingdom
Thirty2	Tim Luna	8:18	Short Film	Germany
Marvin the Vampire	Adrian León	25:00	Short Film	United Kingdom
Behave	Francesco Gabriele	01:18:00	Feature Film	United Kingdom
A Taco	Antonio Rotunno	1:38	Short Film	
Postponed	Luke Shelley	3:41	Short Film	United Kingdom
Edward Has A Tree Inside Him	Kristoffer Lucia	17:00	Short Film	Australia
The Pencil	Thomas Schultz	10:24	Short Film	Kazakhstan
Heart Breaker	Emmanuel Li	4:00	Short Film	United Kingdom
HAGS	Maria Besko	11:00	Short Film	United Kingdom
Maria José Maria	Chico Noras	20:00	Short Film	Portugal
Punch	Andy Edwards	01:20:00	Feature Film	United Kingdom
Fear of heights	Joseph Bolz	4:59	Short Film	Germany
Black As Before	Craig Alexander	4:00	Short Film	United Kingdom
Knock, Knock, (Knock)	Brendan Cleaves	7:00	Short Film	United Kingdom
Ron	William Prince	6:40	Short Film	United Kingdom
The Oval Portrait	Frank Messely	29:40	Short Film	Belgium
Vestige	Joseph Simmons	12:00	Short Film	United Kingdom
All Clowns Are Bastards	Erik Weise	01:30:49	Feature Film	Germany
H. P. Lovecraft's The Old Ones	Chad Ferrin	01:24:00	Feature Film	United States
Spiral to the Center	Alisa Stern, Scott Ampleford	28:53	Short Film	United Kingdom
Side Dish	Alexander Griffith	14:30	Short Film	Germany
Gateway Of The Sun	Michael Doyle	26:26	Short Film	United Kingdom
Trial 22	John Ferrer	9:02	Short Film	United Kingdom
FUSE	Will Dennies	7:56	Short Film	United Kingdom
It Was John	Victor Hampson	20:00	Short Film	United Kingdom
Skinny Dip	Donal O'Dea	1:20	Short Film	Ireland
SIS-TER	Gokhan Toka	18:22	Short Film	Turkey
The Bang	Poppy Moore	3:34	Short Film	United Kingdom
The silent invasion	Connor Marsh	3:56	Short Film	United Kingdom
The Watching	Remi Amber	3:44	Short Film	United Kingdom
Masked	Maria	2:40	Short Film	United Kingdom
Blood for blood	Jude White, Tom Bignold, Claudiu Agoston	2:37	Short Film	United Kingdom
The Zippos Killer	Leonardo-Felix Brinza	2:39	Short Film	United Kingdom
DIGITS	Sofia Loveday	1:53	Short Film	United Kingdom
Moon Rock	Nye Buck, Alfie Mullenger, Jude Stuchfield, Levi Coleman	3:06	Short Film	United Kingdom
Mirrored, (2023) - Horror Short Film By N.E.R.D Productions	Jason Gao	2:11	Short Film	United Kingdom
Trick Or Treat	Rebecca Hearn	3:53	Short Film	United Kingdom
The Missing	Justinas Balsys	4:47	Short Film	United Kingdom
Buckett's Brand New Bar	Arooj Shah	10:54	Short Film	United Kingdom
Three Baths	Rafael De Leon Jr.	6:48	Short Film	United States
Wolf Whistle	Jennifer Handorf	4:40	Short Film	United Kingdom
Once Upon A Midnight	Vicky Wanless	29:50	Short Film	Australia
Watch Me Sleep	John Williams	01:29:17	Feature Film	United Kingdom
Patrick is Outside	Carsten Woike	29:59	Short Film	Germany
Girl in the Dark	Sergii Bazhenov	4:59	Short Film	Ukraine
The Cornucopia Club	Joseph Archer	9:31	Short Film	United Kingdom
Death Date	Alex Mathieson	16:50	Short Film	United Kingdom
MANICURE	Carluccio	9:25	Short Film	United States
SOUL	Deri Watt	5:18	Short Film	United Kingdom
Sincopat	Pol Diggler	13:30	Short Film	Spain
I Love Your Knife!	Ray Brown, Oliver Ferrier	3:12	Short Film	United Kingdom
Visitors-Complete Edition	Kenichi Ugana	01:00:05	Feature Film	Japan
Scalper	Chad Ferrin	01:23:00	Feature Film	United States
ENTER The Dark Woods	Steven Coles	3:51	Short Film	United Kingdom
The Midnight Sleepover Club	Jack Parr	9:17	Short Film	United Kingdom
ON-AIR	Michael Glynn	4:46	Short Film	Canada
Curse of Frankenbite	Theo Maximilian Goble	11:00	Short Film	United Kingdom
Caretaker	James Hood	25:00	Short Film	United Kingdom
The Doll	Thomas Elliott Griffiths	7:25	Short Film	United Kingdom
Promin'	Nykol Firer	32:03	Short Film	Ukraine
Yellow	Darren James King	12:06	Short Film	United Kingdom
The Weaver	Øyvind Willumsen	13:19	Short Film	Norway
Elusive	Lily Le Van Quang	14:56	Short Film	France
Mantra	Stef Meyer, Pascal Bourelier	17:03	Short Film	France
Old Flames	Fugitives	4:37	Short Film	Canada
Escalation	Christian Bachini	15:00	Short Film	Italy
GREED & GORE	Adam Kirkey	15:00	Short Film	Canada
The Bleed	Jason Impey	44:05	Short Film	United Kingdom
Upheaval	Aaran McKenzie	8:51	Short Film	United Kingdom
Love Will Tear Us Apart	Kenichi Ugana	01:26:15	Feature Film	Japan
Dead Skin	Ciara Lilly	11:11	Short Film	United Kingdom
The Order of Ra	James Shannon, Toby Martin Hughes	7:31	Short Film	United Kingdom
Lour	James Bushe	01:27:03	Feature Film	United Kingdom
Pareidolia	Aaron Truss	13:00	Short Film	United Kingdom

== See also ==
- Spencer Hawken
- Romford Film Festival
