= Francesco Gabriele =

Francesco Gabriele may refer to:

- Francesco Gabriele (director)
- Francesco Gabriele (football manager)
- Francesco Gabriele (rower)
