= Bloody Christmas (film) =

- Directed by: Michael Shershenovich
- Written by: Michael Shershenovich
- Produced by: Michael Shershenovich
- Starring: Steve Montague; Robert Youngren; Geretta Geretta
- Cinematography: Michael Shershenovich
- Edited by: Michael Shershenovich
- Music by: Lee Antonio; Romeo Antorino; R.A. The Rugged Man
- Production company: MAS Effect Entertainment
- Release date: 2012
- Running time: 90 minutes
- Country: United States
- Language: English

Bloody Christmas is a 2012 American slasher film directed by Michael Shershenovich, starring Steve Montague, Robert Youngren and Geretta Geretta.

== Cast ==
- Steve Montague as Rich Tague
- Robert Youngren as Father Michael
- Geretta Geretta as Gaylen
- Robert Arensen as Detective Steinman
- Lloyd Kaufman as Pastor Paul

== Reception ==
Ryan Covey of CHUD.com rated the film 2.5 stars out of 5, writing that "It’s padded out, slow, badly acted, and the film and sound quality are not great." The Black Saint of HorrorNews.net rated the film 1.5 "shrouds" out of 5, writing that "It’s definitely bad yet it’s sickeningy watchable at the same time." Jesse Skeen of DVD Talk wrote a negative review of the film, writing that it is "mostly a throwaway production, with very little to please most horror fans."
