= The Great Alligator River =

- Italian theatrical release poster
- Directed by: Sergio Martino
- Produced by: Luciano Martino
- Cinematography: Giancarlo Ferrando
- Music by: Stelvio Cipriani
- Distributed by: Medusa Distribuzione
- Release date: 3 November 1979 (Italy)
- Running time: 90 minutes
- Country: Italy
- Languages: Italian; English

The Great Alligator River, originally Il fiume del grande caimano and also known as Alligators, Caiman, Big Alligator River and The Big Caimano River, is a 1979 Italian adventure film directed by Sergio Martino. In the film, an African God takes the form of a giant man-eating crocodile and attacks tourists at a newly built resort after it becomes angered by encroachment on its land.

== Cast ==
- Barbara Bach as Alice Brandt (Voiced by Susan Spafford)
- Claudio Cassinelli as Daniel Nessel
- Mel Ferrer as Joshua
- Richard Johnson as Prophet Jameson
- Romano Puppo as Peter
- Anny Papa as Laura
- Enzo Fisichella as Maurice, lover of Minou's mother
- Lory Del Santo as Jane
- Silvia Collatina as Minou
- Clara Colosimo as tourist

== Production ==
Filming took place during the summer of 1979 in Sri Lanka and Italy, and began on 3 June; filming was originally slated to start on 20 May.
