= Geretta Geretta =

American actress

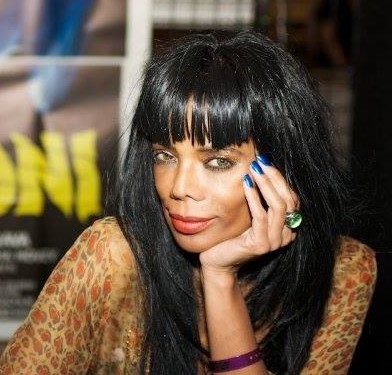
- Born: 1958 (age 67–68); Portland, Oregon, U.S.
- Other names: Geretta Giancarlo; Geretta Giancarlo Field; Janna Ryann
- Occupations: Actress; director; writer
- Years active: 1981–present

Geretta Geretta is an American actress, director and screenwriter who has worked in Ireland, South Africa, Italy, Switzerland, and the United States. Her film roles include several Italian horror films, including Lucio Fulci's Murder Rock (1984) and Lamberto Bava's Demons (1985). Geretta has completed the MFA program in screenwriting at the American Film Institute.

== Biography ==
Geretta Geretta was born and raised in Portland, Oregon. She was once crowned a Rose Princess in the city's annual Rose Festival.

During the 1980s, Geretta starred in several Italian horror films, such as Lucio Fulci's Murder Rock, Bruno Mattei's Rats: Night of Terror, and Lamberto Bava's Demoni. She also appeared alongside Christina Marie Masterson in CRX's video for Get Close, directed by Kansas Bowling.

In 1996, Northern Ireland Film and Television Collective Northern Visions published her collection of 100 poems and verse titled Pardon Me While I Eat My Young.

Geretta was named Best Female Director at the Melbourne Underground Film Festival and Action On Film International Film Festival.

Geretta also served as the creative director of the non-profit "TheWriteRoom.org". The group's mission was "to advance the impact of women in the media via the literary creative arts and allied fields by educating, advocating and housing." The Write Room sponsored an annual screenwriting competition, open to all submissions either written by women or having a strong female lead in a non-stereotypical portrayal. In addition, the group maintained property in Costa Rica's Guanacaste region and offered a residency program to female writers seeking a space of their own in which to create.

Geretta directed the 2001 Swiss feature film Sweetiecakes, starring Stephanie Berger and Urs Althaus. She wrote and coproduced a 2006 film project, which went into turnaround, called Whitepaddy. Adapted from her Sundance Writers Lab Finalist screenplay, When Fish Fly, the project once had Sherilyn Fenn, Lisa Bonet, Hill Harper, Karen Black and Kareem Abdul-Jabbar attached to star. The project is currently archived.

She is an interviewee in the 80s horror documentary In Search of Darkness: Part II (2020), produced and directed by David A. Weiner.

== Selected filmography ==
- Smithereens (1982)
- 2020 Texas Gladiators (1983)
- Murder Rock (1984)
- Rats: Night of Terror (1984)
- Demons (1985)
- Buy & Cell (1987)
- Domino (1988)
- Shocking Dark (1989)
- Bloody Christmas (2012)
- Get Close (Music Video) (2019)
- In Search of Darkness: Part II (Documentary) (2020)
