= Silvia Collatina =

Italian actress

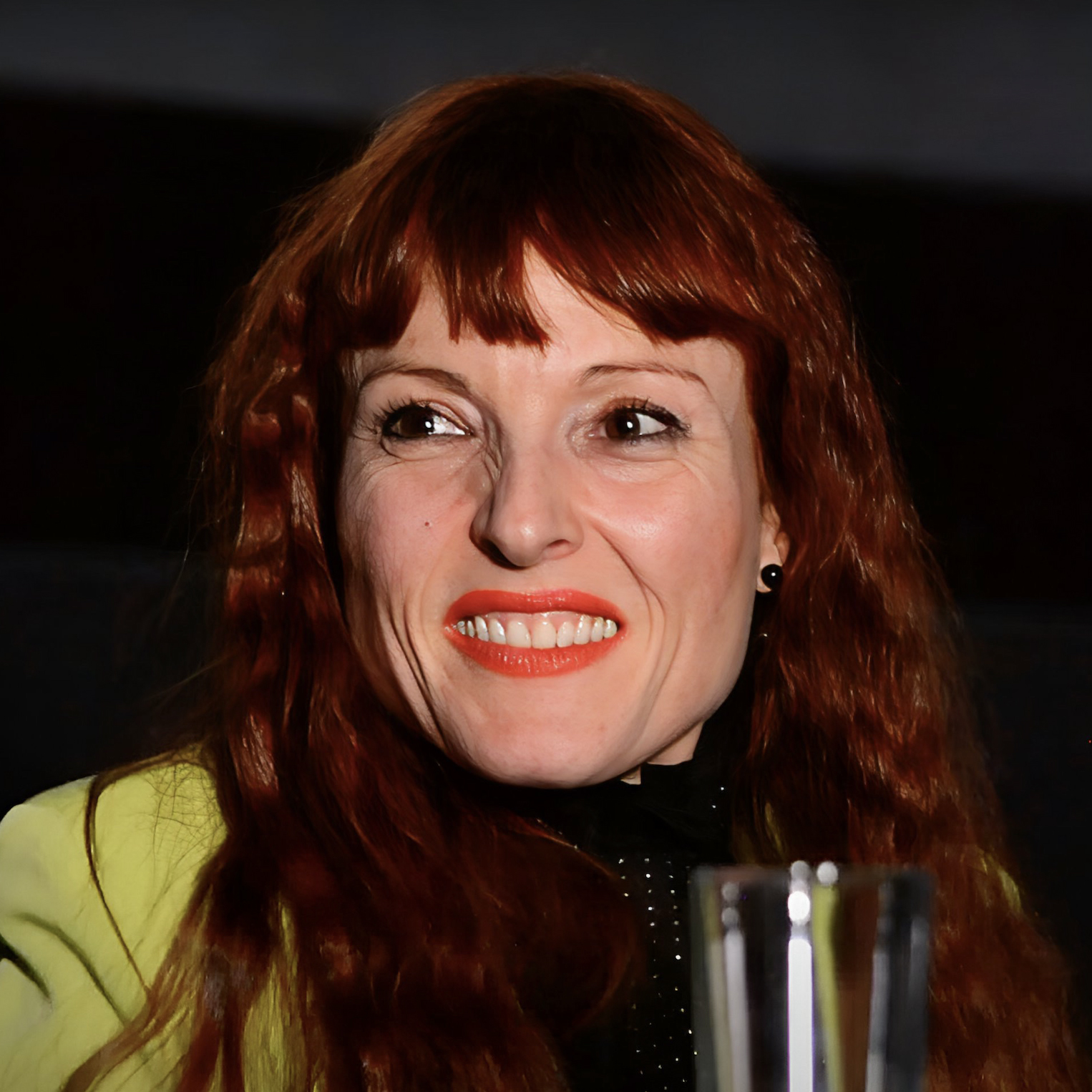
- Collatina at Romford Horror Film Festival 2023
- Born: 14 January 1972 (age 54); Rome, Italy
- Occupations: Actress, singer
- Years active: 1977–present
- Known for: The Great Alligator; The House by the Cemetery; Murder Rock

Silvia Collatina (born 14 January 1972 in Rome, Lazio, Italy) is an Italian actress who appeared in several movies of the late 1970s and 80s. She is best known for her roles in The Great Alligator, The House by the Cemetery and Murder Rock.

== Career ==
Collatina was introduced to a talent agent, through a family friend who was also a child actress and invited her to a casting when she was 5 years old. She made her debut later that year in 1977 with the documentary of Sergio Spina "Child Psychology", in the episode "I don't want to go to school".

In 1979 she was cast in her first feature film role of Minou in Sergio Martino’s The Great Alligator. In an interview with Cryptic Rock, Collatina revealed that as a child she was a little pest, perfect casting for that role. In another interview she also said that Sergio Martino was a very polite person on set and felt at ease with him on set and are still in touch today.

Collatina was cast in 1981 as the ghost child ‘’Mae Freudstein’’ in Lucio Fulci’s critically acclaimed cult horror The House by the Cemetery. In her interview with Cryptic Rock she revealed Fulci could be sometimes a little rude, but had a great respect for him knowing he was a great director, and she followed strictly his directions. She also revealed that Paolo Malco, Catriona MacColl and Giovanni Frezza were like a big family on set and has seen some of them many times at Horror conventions in the US. She believes that The House by the Cemetery still appeals to people thanks to its fascinating setting such as the pastel colours of the movie, the mystery of her character and the finale.

In 1984 Collatina was cast as Molly in Murderock. Her character was a disabled child who had developed a strong sense of sadism and the macabre. In an interview with Lionel Grenier, Collatina recalled Fulci was happy to be working again with her after the success of The House by the Cemetery and looking forward to do another film together. Collatina originally had concerns about the wheelchair being used and began training using it for testing her capabilities. At first, Fulci wanted to put prosthetic legs on her, to make them look even more bony and sickly, but in the end he opted for Collatinas legs, covered by a blanket. When asked about how her character differed from herself; she described Molly as very spoilt and mean little girl because of her disability, while she is more sweet and friendly even if they share the same taste for the macabre.

During the early to mid-1980s Collatina appeared in many commercials including: Polaroid, Barilla, Eldorado, Bauli, Danone, Plasmon, Nestlé, Bassetti, and Findus.

In 1985, Collatina as a teenager made the decision to leave the industry.

Collatina attended the 2009 Horror Hound Convention which took place in Newark (US). She formed part of the Italian delegation of horror movie actors of the 80s and also took part in the 30th Anniversary cast reunion with House by the Cemetery at the 2011 Horror Hound Convention in Indianapolis (US). Collatina attended the International Fantasy Film Festival in 2012 as a member of the jury for horror short films. She was also a honoured guest at the Paranormal Media Festival in 2014 in Italy (Maenza, Latina).

In 2020, as part of the Blu-Ray and 4K re-release of The House by the Cemetery by Arrow Films her 2011 interview with fellow actor Giovanni Frezza was added as part of the bonus features of its release as "Children of the Night".

In 2021, she was a member of the jury for the Italian Horror Fantasy Festival organized by Luigi Pastore.

Collatina on the set of Fantasmagoria in 2022

In May 2022, Collatina played the demonic character of Tiziana in the episode “Ultimo Titivillus” – 2nd season of the web series Fantasmagoria created by Byron Rink (Orefilm Production).

In August 2022 Collatina attended the Vespertilio Awards in Rome as a member of the jury. In February 2023 she also attended the Romford Horror Film Festival as special guest together with Giovanni Lombardo Radice. In an interview with the festival director Spencer Hawken, Collatina revealed she didn't expect to still be going places and talking about this film 40 years later. She continues to attend horror conventions both in Italy and around the world.

== Personal ==
Collatina was born in Rome, Lazio, Italy. Her father Alberto Collatina was an acclaimed Jazz musician. She has a personal collection of more than 100 decorative skulls, she got her 107th skull in Helsingborg Sweden october 2025 at the scifiworld convention and she enjoys visiting grave yards (monumental or local) wherever she goes.

== Filmography ==
†	Productions that have not yet been released.

=== Films ===
Year	Title	Director	Role	Notes
1979	The Great Alligator	Sergio Martino	Minou	
1980	Alice Nel Paese Delle Cartaviglie	Gianni Toti	Alice	
1981	The House by the Cemetery	Lucio Fulci	Mae Freudstein	
1984	Murder Rock	Lucio Fulci	Molly	
2014	Violets Bloom at empty Grave	Chris Milewski	Karen Cook	Voiceover (Short Film)
2022	Heller's Lane	Jon Alcaide	Linda	Voiceover (Short Film)
2022	Il Tempo del Sogno	Claudio Lattanzi	As Herself	
2024	The Witches of the Sands †	Tony Mardon	Silvia	
2024	Cose Nere †	Francesco Tassara	Clara	

=== Television ===
Year	Title	Director	Role	Notes
1972	Letti Selvaggi	Luigi Zampa	Daughter	Episode "Young Wife”
1977	Child Psychology	Sergio Spina	Silvia	Episode "I don't want to go to school”
1981	George Sand	Giorgio Albertazzi	Ninì	Episode 1.1
2022	Fantasmagoria	Byron Rink	Tiziana	Episode 2.2 Ultimo Titivillus (Web Series)

=== Interviews ===
Year	Title	Interviewer	Notes
2009	I'm an Actress!	Eric Marciano	
2011	Children of the Night	Art Ettinger	
2012	The House by the Cemetery Onstage Q&A Cast Reunion	Callum Waddell	30th Anniversary Reunion
2012	Ladies of Italian Horror	Callum Waddell	
2021	Rude Horror Podcast	Marcus Rude	(Podcast)
2023	Romford Horror Festival: Live Audience with Silvia Collatina	Spencer Hawken	Festival Q&A Interview

== See also ==
- Sergio Martino
- The Great Alligator
- Gianni Toti
- Lucio Fulci
- The House by the Cemetery
- Murder Rock
- Giorgio Albertazzi
