= Domino (1988 film) =

1988 Italian erotic drama film

- Theatrical release poster by Enzo Sciotti
- Directed by: Ivana Massetti
- Written by: Gérard Brach; Ivana Massetti
- Produced by: Giovanni Di Clemente; Bruno Ridolfi
- Starring: Brigitte Nielsen; Tomas Arana; Kim Rossi Stuart
- Cinematography: Tonino Nardi
- Edited by: Anna Rosa Napoli
- Music by: Alessandro Murzi; Massimo Terracini
- Distributed by: Orion Pictures; Taurus Entertainment Company
- Release date: 1988
- Running time: 97 minutes
- Country: Italy
- Languages: Italian; English

Domino, is a 1988 Italian erotic drama film directed by Ivana Massetti.

== Plot ==
Domino is a desirable and enigmatic woman of thirty. A video director, Domino feels empty without love in her life. When a mysterious caller provocatively stimulates her deepest yearnings, she changes her lifestyle to transform her most intimate dreams and desires into an erotic reality. While working on a documentary about singer Billie Holiday, Domino indulges in a meeting with a blind stranger whom she allows to fondle her large breasts, a visit to a strip club where she becomes aroused watching her friend Gabriele perform, and a sexual encounter with a man which she videotapes and later watches while she masturbates. In all of these, Domino is unable to reach an orgasm.

== Cast ==
- Brigitte Nielsen as Domino
- Tomas Arana as Gavros
- Kim Rossi Stuart as Eugene
- Stéphane Ferrara as Paul Du Lac
- David Warbeck as 'Blind'
- Geretta Geretta as Gabriele
- Antonella Tinazzo as Marie
- Sheila Constantini Folli as Alice
- Pascal Druant as Victor
- Cyrus Elias as Alex
- Joy Garrison as Billie Holiday

== See also ==
- List of Italian films of 1988
