= Francesco Gabriele (director) =

- Born: 15 September 1987 (age 38); Chieti, Italy
- Education: London Film School; American Academy of Dramatic Arts
- Occupations: Director; screenwriter; producer

Francesco Gabriele is a London-based British-Italian film director, screenwriter, and producer.

He graduated with an MA in Filmmaking from the London Film School and is a graduate of the American Academy of Dramatic Arts in Los Angeles.

In 2014, he founded the production company Thespian Films Ltd.

His short film Italian Miracle played at over 50 festivals worldwide. He was nominated for "Best International Short" and "Best Comedy" at the Academy Awards & BAFTA Qualifying LA-Short Fest and won, among other awards, the "Jury Award" at the Stony Brook Film Festival in New York and achieved international distribution.

In 2017 he wrote, produced and directed the feature Blue Hollywood. The film had its UK Premiere at the BT Tower in London as the closing night film of the BAFTA Qualifying British Urban Film Festival and it was also screened in numerous festivals in Canada, Italy, Sweden, Bulgaria, Germany, China, Russia and the USA receiving mentions and awards. In 2020 it was distributed on Amazon Prime, Blu-ray and DVD in the US.

Francesco Gabriele's recent work showcases his growing influence in the horror and dark-comedy genres.

In 2020 he produced and directed the short horror film For Sale, starring Nicolas Vaporidis and Randall Paul which premiered at Capri Hollywood International Film Festival, Flaiano Prizes and in the Official Selection at Bucheon International Fantastic Film Festival.

In 2023, he directed the dark-comedy short film Cul-de-sac, which went on to win multiple awards. In 2024, Cul-de-sac gained further recognition when it was released on Omeleto, a renowned YouTube platform that showcases award-winning short films, bringing his work to a wider international audience.

In addition to his achievements in short films, Gabriele has also made a mark in the horror feature film industry. In 2023, he directed Behave, a horror feature that premiered at the Dracula Film Festival in Romania, one of the most respected festivals for the genre and had its UK Premiere at Romford Horror Film Festival. Behave was subsequently released in 2024 across major markets including the US, UK, and Canada. That same year, he directed The Bad Nun 3, distributed internationally by ITN Studios, further solidifying his role as a director within the international horror film scene.

Francesco is a member of the European Film Academy, Directors UK, a Fellow of the Royal Society of Arts and the Head of Screen and Audio at the Royal Birmingham Conservatoire.
