= The House by the Cemetery =

1981 Italian horror film directed by Lucio Fulci

- Italian theatrical release poster
- Italian: Quella villa accanto al cimitero
- Directed by: Lucio Fulci
- Screenplay by: Dardano Sacchetti; Giorgio Mariuzzo; Lucio Fulci
- Story by: Elisa Livia Briganti
- Produced by: Fabrizio De Angelis
- Starring: Katherine MacColl; Paolo Malco; Ania Pieroni; Giovanni Frezza; Silvia Collatina; Dagmar Lassander
- Cinematography: Sergio Salvati
- Edited by: Vincenzo Tomassi
- Music by: Walter Rizzati; Alessando Blonksteiner
- Production company: Fulvia Film
- Distributed by: Medusa Distribuzione
- Release date: 14 August 1981 (Italy)
- Running time: 86 minutes
- Country: Italy
- Languages: Italian; English
- Budget: £1.2 million
- Box office: 462 million Italian lire

The House by the Cemetery (Italian: Quella villa accanto al cimitero) is a 1981 Italian supernatural horror film directed by Lucio Fulci, co-written with Dardano Sacchetti and Giorgio Mariuzzo, and starring Katherine MacColl, Paolo Malco, Ania Pieroni, Giovanni Frezza, Silvia Collatina, and Dagmar Lassander. The third and final installment in Fulci's Gates of Hell trilogy, preceded by City of the Living Dead and The Beyond, the plot revolves around a series of murders committed by a ghoulish and demonic serial killer taking place in a Massachusetts home that happens to be hiding a gruesome secret within its basement walls.

Fulci developed the screenplay for The House by the Cemetery with inspiration from the works of H. P. Lovecraft, while co-writer Sacchetti was influenced by the novella The Turn of the Screw by Henry James. Principal photography took place in the spring of 1980 in New York City and the Greater Boston area, with additional photography occurring in Rome at the De Paolis In.Co.R. Studios.

Upon its premiere in Italy in August 1981, The House by the Cemetery became a domestic box-office success, grossing 462 million Italian lire, making it Fulci's most profitable horror film released in the 1980s.

== Plot ==
A woman looks for her boyfriend in an abandoned house. After discovering his body stabbed with scissors, she is killed with a French knife and dragged through a cellar door by a monstrous figure.

Meanwhile, Bob Boyle and his parents, Norman and Lucy, move into a house in New Whitby, Massachusetts. Norman's ex-colleague, Dr. Peterson, who murdered his mistress before committing suicide, was the previous owner. The Boyles are to stay there while Norman researches old houses. As his mother packs, Bob notices a photograph of a house in which a girl is standing at the window with a fearful expression. In New Whitby, Boston, Bob waits in his parents' car while they collect the house keys. The girl from the photograph, Mae Freudstein, appears across the street and warns him to stay away. Only Bob can see her. In the real estate office, Mrs. Laura Gittleson is annoyed when her colleague hands the couple "the Freudstein keys." She insists that it is called "Oak Mansion" and promises to find the Boyles a babysitter.

Oak Mansion is in poor condition. The cellar door is locked and nailed shut. A woman arrives and introduces herself as Ann, the babysitter. That night, Norman hears noises and finds Ann unblocking the cellar door. The next day, Norman goes to the library to peruse Peterson's materials. The chief librarian, Mr. Wheatley, appears to recognize him, but Norman claims that he is mistaken. The assistant librarian then informs Norman that Peterson conducted private research at the house. He studied records of area disappearances and other demographic data.

Mae shows Bob a tombstone on the grounds marked "Mary Freudstein" and says she is not buried there. Indoors, Lucy finds the tombstone of "Jacob Tess Freudstein" while sweeping the hallway. Norman later reassures her that it is normal for some older houses to have indoor tombs. He opens the cellar door and walks down the stairs, only to be attacked by a bat, which will not let go until he stabs it repeatedly. Spooked, the family drives to the real estate office and demands to be re-housed, but are told it will be days before they can move. While the Boyles are at the hospital to treat Norman's injuries from the bat, Mrs. Gittleson arrives at the house to tell them of a new property. Letting herself in, she stands over the Freudstein tombstone, which cracks apart, pinning her ankle. The killer then stabs Gittleson to death with a fireplace poker and drags her into the cellar.

Lucy finds Ann cleaning a bloodstain on the kitchen floor the next morning. Ann avoids Lucy's questions about the stain. Meanwhile, Norman discovers that Freudstein was a Victorian surgeon who conducted illegal experiments. Norman must travel to New York to research Freudstein. On the way, he stops by the library and finds an audio cassette by Peterson. It documents Peterson's madness. Norman destroys the cassette by dropping it into a furnace pipe.

Ann goes to the cellar looking for Bob and hears childlike sobbing. Freudstein then decapitates her. Bob sees Ann's head and runs from the cellar, screaming. Lucy returns to find Bob crying in his room, but refuses to believe his account about Ann. That evening, Bob returns to the cellar looking for Ann but gets locked in. Lucy hears Bob's cries and tries to open the cellar door. Norman returns and hacks the door with a hatchet when she cannot open it. The rotting hand of Dr. Freudstein appears and restrains Bob against the door as the hatchet chops through it. The axe eventually breaks through the door and severs the ghoul's hand. He staggers back down the stairs.

Norman and Lucy get into the cellar, which contains several mutilated bodies, surgical equipment, and a slab. Freudstein is a living corpse with rotting flesh. The 150-year-old Freudstein lives by using his victims' parts to regenerate blood cells. Norman attacks the ghoul, who twists the hatchet away. Grabbing a knife from the slab, Norman stabs Freudstein, causing flesh and maggots to ooze out of the latter's old lab coat. Freudstein grabs Norman and rips open his throat. Lucy and Bob climb a ladder leading to the underside of the cracked tombstone. Lucy strains to shift the stone. Freudstein grabs Lucy and drags her down the stairs. Her head bangs on each step on the way down, killing her. As Freudstein advances up the ladder, Bob strains to escape. As Freudstein grabs Bob's leg, he is pulled up by Mae, who is with her mother, Mary Freudstein. She leads Mae and Bob down the grove into what appears to be a ghost world.

== Cast ==
- Catriona MacColl as Lucy Boyle (credited as Katherine MacColl)
- Paolo Malco as Dr. Norman Boyle
- Ania Pieroni as Ann (babysitter)
- Giovanni Frezza as Bob Boyle
- Silvia Collatina as Mae Freudstein
- Dagmar Lassander as Laura Gittleson
- Giovanni De Nava as Dr. Jacob Freudstein
- Daniela Doria as Maggie
- Gianpaolo Saccarola as Daniel Douglas
- Carlo De Mejo as Mr. Wheatley
- Kenneth A. Olsen as Harold (credited as John Olson)
- Elmer Johnsson as the Cemetery Caretaker
- Ranieri Ferrara as a Steve
- Teresa Rossi Passante as Mary Freudstein
- Lucio Fulci as Professor Mueller (uncredited)

== Production ==
=== Development ===
Fulci later claimed that after making The Black Cat and The Beyond he wanted to make a film in tribute to H. P. Lovecraft without the film being based on one of his stories, but written as if it existed within the Lovecraft universe. Screenwriter Dardano Sacchetti was inspired by Henry James' The Turn of the Screw. Sacchetti also stated that the film was based on his own personal experiences as a child, being raised in a large country house with a big dark basement, and that age 9 he had to cross a cemetery at night. In his biography, Fulci spoke negatively about Sacchetti's screenwriting, saying that The House by the Cemetery was derivative of The House That Screamed. The film went through several changes from the original story by Elisa Briganti and the script by Sacchetti. The script was originally titled La notte dell'inferno (transl. The Night of Hell) which became La casa di Freudstein and then Quella casa accanto al cimitero. Sacchetti's script was revised by Fulci and Giorgio Mariuzzo, Mariuzzo claimed he worked as a script doctor slightly changing work stating that Sacchetti's scripts were often too short. Sacchetti commented on this, stating that "Mariuzzo always intervened afterward, either because I had to leave to work on another film or refused to make those changes that Lucio demanded. That was the reason for our arguments."

=== Filming ===
The House by the Cemetery was shot on location in New York City, Boston, and Concord. The film was also shot in studios at De Paolis In.Co.R. Studios in Rome. Shooting took eight weeks between 16 March and May 1981. The film was made on a budget of approximately 600 million Italian lire. Despite the credits stating that the special make-up effects were provided by Giannetto di Rossi and Maurizio Trani, only Trani worked on the film.

== Release ==
The Italian ratings board asked for a brief six-second cut in The House by the Cemetery where Dagmar Lassander's character Laura Gittleson is murdered; Fulci obliged only because of his dissatisfaction with the effects in certain shots. The film opened in Turin on 14 August 1981, and was distributed in Italy by Medusa Distribuzione.

The film was distributed by Eagle Films in the United Kingdom, opening in Derbyshire on 2 July 1982, before expanding to other cities through the fall of 1982. The film was passed by the BBFC after scenes involving Ann's and Laura's murders were trimmed; this gave the film an 84-minute 49 second running time.

=== Home media ===
The 84-minute British cut of the film was released on home video in the UK and was later placed on the video nasties list after the Video Recordings Act 1984. It was re-released on home video in 1988 with four minutes and eleven seconds of the film cut. The film was re-released on 29 May 2001 with only 33 seconds cut and again in 2009 uncut. Anchor Bay Entertainment released the film on VHS and DVD in 2001, the latter of which was re-pressed by Blue Underground in 2007.

Blue Underground re-released the film on Blu-ray and DVD on 25 October 2011 with a new 2K transfer. A 3-disc limited edition Blu-ray was released by Blue Underground in January 2020, followed by a 4K UHD Blu-ray on 25 August 2020. In October 2023, Arrow Films also released a 4K disc in the United Kingdom, sourced from Blue Underground's 2020 restoration.

== Reception ==
=== Box office ===
The film grossed a total of 1,407,981,297 lire in Italy, making it Fulci's most financially successful horror film of the 1980s. Prior to the film's theatrical release in France, it was shown at the Festival International du film fantastique et de science-fiction in Paris alongside Fulci's earlier film The Black Cat. It was released in France on 24 March 1982 and in the United States on 1 March 1984. The American trailer was narrated by the noted monologuist Brother Theodore.

=== Critical response ===
From contemporary reviews, Julian Petley of Monthly Film Bulletin commented that the film had a "Frankenstein theme" but that "the film adds little to the well-worked legend" and that "this would matter less were the film visually richer, but for the most part it is comparatively sober and restrained, at least by Fulci standards" Petley continued that "the film undeniably has its moments–Bob's escape from the cellar; the human debris of Freudstein's laboratory; an attack by a particularly ferocious and tenacious bat; the climactic appearance of the horribly mutated Freudstein" Giovanna Grassi of Corriere della Sera dismissed it as an "Italian Shining" and concluded it to be "a condensation of rip-offs, commonplaces and badly repeated horror conventions." Aldo Vigano of La Stampa commented on the use of children in the film, stating that "to see children involved in such a gruesome and oppressive horror story will perhaps cause disconcert and discomfort, rather than pity in many spectators." In France, Philippe Ross of La Revue du cinéma proclaimed that Fulci had to show "us something other than these endless scenes of butchery who truly become more and more painful and soporific" Christophe Gans reviewed the film in L'Écran fantastique stated that "Except for two or three welcome details [...] the suspense "for laughter", so appreciated by American filmmakers, here becomes particularly tedious" Gans praised the films visuals, noting "melancholic, wintery photography" while still concluding that the film's "repertoire of gimmicks repeated or borrowed from Argento, our greatest regrets is the absence of madness in the explanation of the monster, yelled amid the din of a stretched suspense."

From retrospective reviews, film review aggregator Rotten Tomatoes reported an approval rating of 45%, based on 11 reviews, with an average rating of 4.50/10. Time Out called the film "a hack-work of almost awesome incoherence". AllMovie praised the film, complimenting its atmosphere.

== Bibliography ==
- Curti, Roberto (2019). Italian Gothic Horror Films, 1980-1989. Jefferson, North Carolina: McFarland. ISBN 978-1-476-67243-4.
- Milne, Tom, ed. (1991). The Time Out Film Guide (Second ed.). New York City, New York: Penguin Books. ISBN 0-14-014592-3.
- Muir, John Kenneth (2012). Horror Films of the 1980s. Vol. 1. Jefferson, North Carolina: McFarland. ISBN 978-0-786-47298-7.
