= Manos: The Hands of Fate =

- Theatrical release poster
- Directed by: Harold P. Warren
- Written by: Harold P. Warren
- Produced by: Harold P. Warren
- Starring: Tom Neyman; John Reynolds; Diane Mahree; Harold P. Warren
- Cinematography: Robert Guidry
- Edited by: James Sullivan
- Music by: Russ Huddleston; Robert Smith Jr.
- Production companies: Sun City Films; Norm-Iris Productions
- Distributed by: Emerson Film Enterprises
- Release date: November 15, 1966
- Running time: 74 minutes
- Country: United States
- Language: English
- Budget: $19,000

Manos: The Hands of Fate is a 1966 American independent folk horror film written, directed, and produced by Harold P. Warren. It stars Warren, Tom Neyman, John Reynolds, and Diane Mahree. The film follows a family getting lost during their vacation road trip through the Texas desert and becoming stranded at the lodge of a polygynous pagan cult led by the Master who decides their fate.

Warren was a fertilizer salesman from El Paso, Texas, who allegedly made the film as a result of a bet with screenwriter Stirling Silliphant. After raising Warren $19,000 from locals to finance it, production had problems with the faulty rental equipment and neglected editing, resulting in numerous technical errors in the final cut. It was released on November 15, 1966. The theatrical debut was poorly received, playing only at the Capri Theater in El Paso and some drive-ins around West Texas.

Manos: The Hands of Fate remained in obscurity until 1993, when it was featured in an episode of Mystery Science Theater 3000, a television series based around mocking B movies, which became the show's most popular episode. The episode gave the film its cult reputation as one of the worst films ever made. The film has been criticized for its editing, visuals, plot, pacing, acting, and dubbing. Its MST3K appearance resulted in several home video releases of the original film and the episode itself.

The original 16 mm workprint was discovered in 2011; a restored version made from it was released on Blu-ray by Synapse Films on October 13, 2015. Although the film was thought to be in the public domain, after a copyrighted screenplay was discovered, it left its legal status uncertain, while a related trademark attempt by the director's son was abandoned in 2018. Manos: The Hands of Fate has also been adapted into other media, including multiple stage productions. Manos: The Search for Valley Lodge was a planned sequel that was canceled in 2014. It was followed by a prequel, Manos: The Rise of Torgo, and a sequel, Manos Returns, both released in 2018. A video game based on the film was developed and published for iOS by FreakZone Games in 2012. A television series titled The Manos Chronicles was made in 2023.

== Plot ==
Manos: The Hands of Fate (1966)

While on vacation near El Paso, Texas, Michael, Margaret, their young daughter Debbie, and their dog, Peppy, drive through the desert in search of the Valley Lodge. Margaret insists they are lost, and Michael claims they are not. They are stopped by a local deputy for a broken taillight, and released because Michael asks him for mercy on their "first vacation". After driving through farmland and the desert, the family reaches a house. The satyr-like Torgo is caretaker "while the Master is away". Michael and Margaret ask Torgo for directions to the Valley Lodge, which Torgo denies knowing. Frustrated, Michael asks Torgo to let him and his family stay the night, despite objections from both Torgo and Margaret.

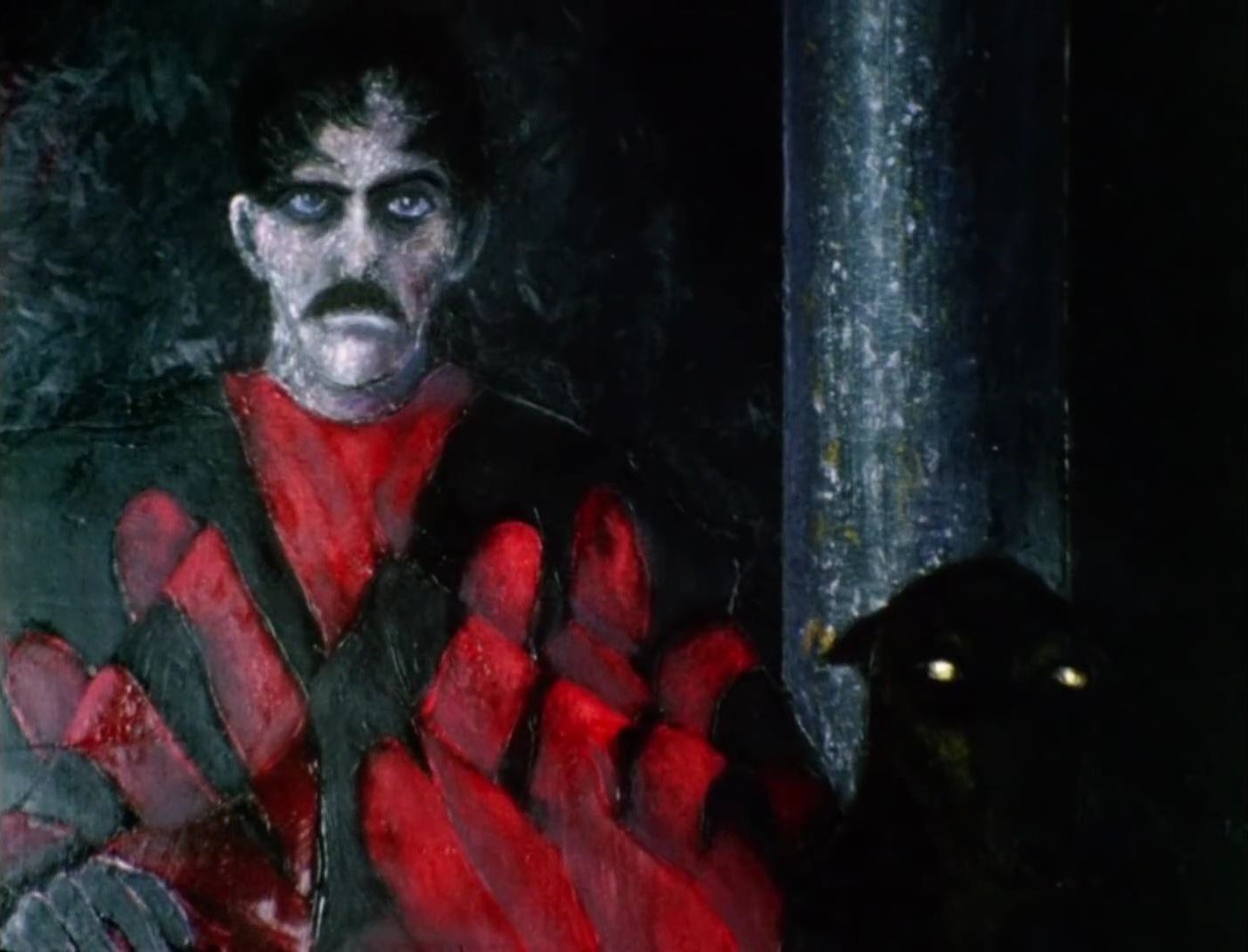
Painting of the Master (Tom Neyman)

Inside the house, Michael and Margaret find a painting of the Master and a dog with glowing eyes. A howl frightens Margaret; Peppy breaks away from Debbie and runs outside. Michael investigates with a flashlight and revolver from his car and finds Peppy lying dead on the ground. Michael buries the dog in the desert and returns to the house. Meanwhile, Torgo reveals his attraction to Margaret and wants to keep her, defying the Master's desire to marry her. Margaret threatens to tell Michael of Torgo's advances, but Torgo persuades her to stay silent by promising to protect her. Michael cannot start the car. Torgo tells them there is no phone in the house, so the family decides to stay the night.

Torgo secretly watches Margaret changing her clothes. Michael and Margaret find Debbie is gone and start looking for her, going outside and shouting Debbie's name. Debbie returns, holding the leash of the dog from the painting. Following Debbie, Michael and Margaret stumble upon the Master and his wives, sleeping around a blazing fire. The wives are dressed in nightgowns, the Master in a robe with two red hands on it. Margaret and Debbie run back to the house to get their things and escape. As Michael runs behind them, Torgo uses a stick to knock him out and then ties him to a pole. The Master awakens and summons his wives, announcing that Michael must be sacrificed to the deity Manos, and that Margaret and Debbie will become his new wives. He leaves.

The wives argue with each other about whether Debbie should become one of them or also be sacrificed. This turns into a catfight, where the wives tumble around in the dirt. The Master returns, breaks up the fight and decides to sacrifice Torgo and his own first wife instead. Meanwhile, Michael wakes up, unties himself and returns to the house to collect Margaret and Debbie. The family runs off into the desert to escape. The Master summons Torgo and hypnotizes him, ordering the wives to kill him. Two of the wives attack Torgo with their hands, causing him to fall to the ground, seemingly dead. He later regains consciousness and stands up.

The Master severs and burns Torgo's left hand. Torgo runs off into the darkness with his stump of a wrist in flames, and the Master sacrifices his first wife. As Michael, Margaret and Debbie run through the desert, Margaret falls and says she cannot go any farther. A rattlesnake appears and Michael shoots it. The noise attracts the deputies, who assume, because of the desert echoes, that it came from Mexico, and leave. Margaret convinces Michael to return to the house, as the cult would never think to look for them there. They go back and find the Master and his dog waiting for them. The Master steps towards them, and Michael fires his gun in shock, to no effect.

Some time later, two women starting their vacation drive through a rainstorm, searching for shelter. When they find the Master's house, the entranced Michael greets them, saying "I am Michael, I take care of the place while The Master is away." Margaret and Debbie have become wives of the Master, and all are asleep.

== Cast ==
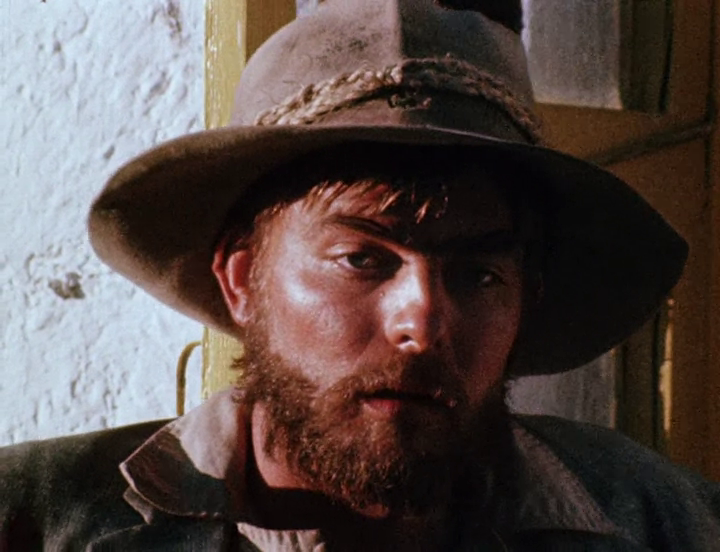
John Reynolds as Torgo

- Harold P. Warren as Michael
- John Reynolds as Torgo
- Diane "Mahree" Adelson as Margaret
- Jackey Neyman-Jones as Debbie
- Tom Neyman as The Master
- Stephanie Nielson, Sherry Proctor, Robin Redd, Pat Coburn, Bettye Birns, and Pat Sullivan as the Master's wives
- Bernie Rosenblum as teenage boy
- Joyce Molleur as teenage girl
- William Bryan Jennings and George Cavender as police officers
- Jay Hall as girl in convertible
- Lelaine Hansard as girl in convertible

Credits adapted from TV Guide.

== Production ==
Director Harold P. Warren

Manos: The Hands of Fate was written, directed, and produced by Harold P. Warren. Warren was a fertilizer salesman, (Note: Sources differ on his occupation.) from El Paso, Texas. He was very active in the theater scene in El Paso, and he once appeared as a walk-on for the television series Route 66, where he met screenwriter Stirling Silliphant. According to Entertainment Weekly, while chatting with Silliphant in a local coffee shop, Warren claimed that it was not difficult to make a movie, and he bet Silliphant that he could make an entire film on his own. After placing the bet, Warren began the first outline of his script on a napkin, right inside the coffee shop. Warren raised US$19,000 (equivalent to $189,000 in 2025) from neighbors and friends to finance it. He hired a group of actors from a local theater and a modeling agency. Warren promised the cast and crew a share of profit.

In mid-1966, it was filmed with the working title The Lodge of Sins. It was shot mainly on the ranch of Colbert Coldwell, a lawyer who shared an office floor with Warren and who later became a judge in El Paso County. Most equipment was rented, so Warren hurriedly maximized the number of shots before the rental deadline. The 16 mm Bell & Howell Filmo camera is wound by hand, providing roughly 30 seconds of footage. The Filmo camera also had problems with focusing and framing shots at the same time. Later during production, Warren renamed the film Manos: The Hands of Fate. According to an interview with Bob Guidry, the cinematographer, and Bernie Rosenblum, the stunt coordinator, Warren's crew became so bemused and tempers frayed that they derisively called the film Mangos: Cans of Fruit behind his back.

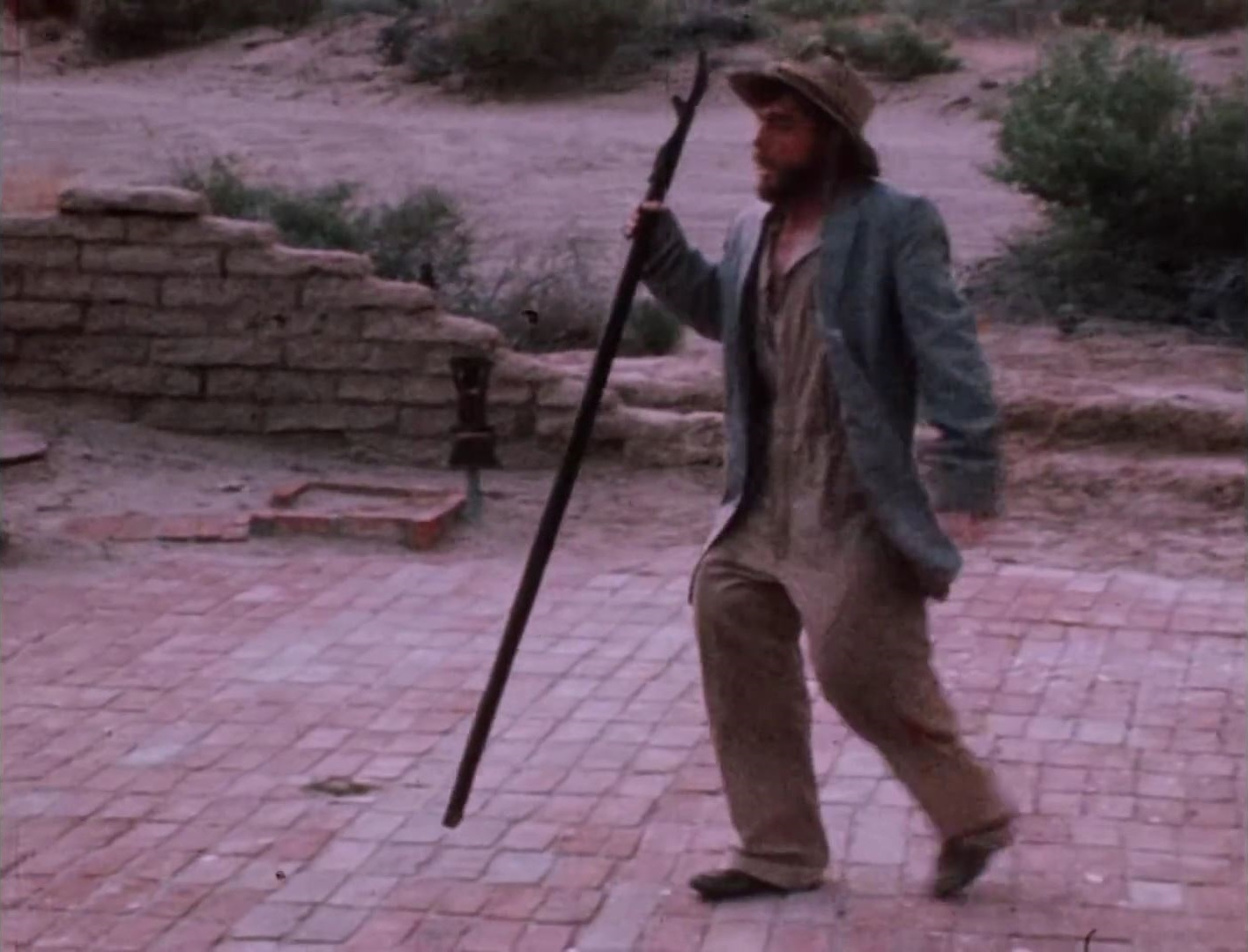
Torgo is a satyr-like character. This was portrayed by having Reynolds wear metallic rigging under his trousers

To portray Torgo's satyr-like character, actor Tom Neyman designed a metallic rigging worn under actor John Reynolds trousers. Reynolds constructed the metallic rigging. The effect conveyed by his work was to leave his character with oversized knees. Reynolds was reportedly on drugs throughout the whole production. Warren shot night-for-night scenes, because many of the cast and crew also held day jobs. In the scene in which the police investigate Michael's gunfire, the lights could cover only a few feet forward, so the police stood there to feign a search and leave without any scenery or a panning shot.

During filming, Warren said that presenting Diane Mahree as the Texas Beauty Queen would generate good publicity for his movie. He signed her to a regional West Texas beauty pageant that would lead to Miss Texas and then to the Miss America pageant, but he neglected to tell her about it until she was accepted as an entrant. She complied and appeared onstage as a finalist. Warren contracted with a modeling agency to provide the actresses who would play the Master's wives, including Joyce Molleur. She broke her foot early in production, so Warren retained her by rewriting the script to include a young couple kissing in a car on the side of the road, who are otherwise unconnected to the plot.

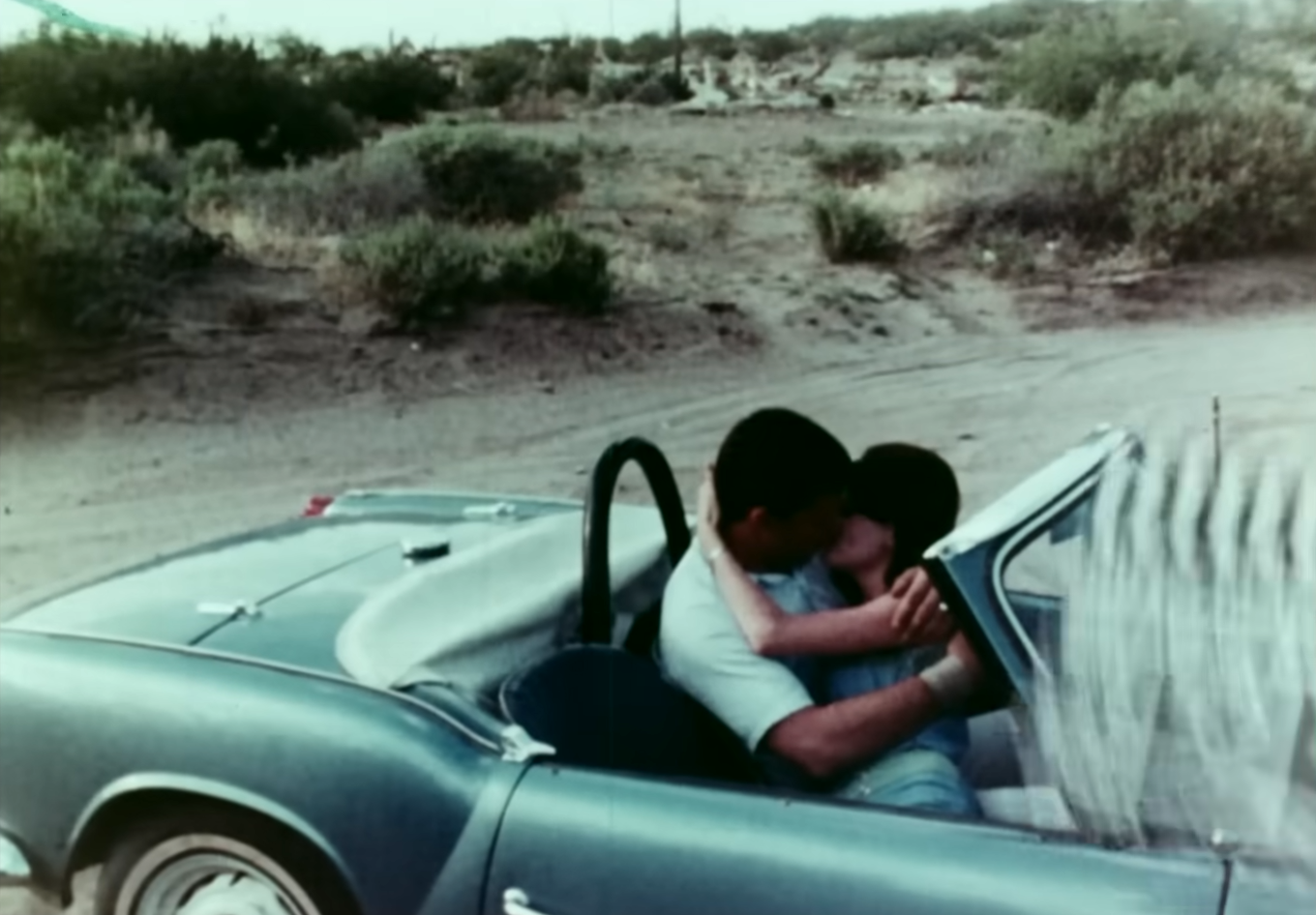
Editing failed to remove the clapperboard, which is momentarily visible for a few frames

Post-production efforts were minimal, though Warren promised crew members that any problems in filming would be fixed in later editing. For example, the clapperboard is momentarily visible. Several technical gaffes made it into the film, including scenes filmed out of focus, a marking slate being seen in one shot, the scarf on the female lead's head disappearing and reappearing, and an insect bumping the camera lens. According to NBC News, the entire opening sequence, which consists of the main characters in "endless, dull driving scenes," was supposed to have opening credits but were supposedly forgotten by the crew. Rather than using location sync sound recording, all sound effects and dialogue were overdubbed in post-production by few people, including Warren, his wife, Tom Neyman, and Diane Mahree. A grown woman dubbed the voice for Jackey Neyman-Jones, the seven-year-old girl who played Debbie.

A Strange Gait
A brief arrangement of the Torgo theme from the film, by Russ Huddleston and Robert Smith Jr.

The soundtrack was composted by Russ Huddleston and Robert Smith Jr. Stereogum said that Torgo's theme, "A Strange Gait," is "arguably the most famous part of the Manos soundtrack, if any part of the soundtrack can be called famous." John Reynolds died by suicide by gunshot on October 16, 1966, one month before the premiere. He was 25 years old.

== Release ==
The Capri Theater in El Paso, Texas (pictured in c. 1930s)

The film premiered at the Capri Theater in Warren's hometown of El Paso, Texas on November 15, 1966, as a benefit for the local cerebral palsy fund. Warren rented a searchlight, and paid for the cast to be delivered by limousine. Warren only had enough budget to rent a single limousine. This meant that limousine would delivered one group, then drove around the block for another. Jackey Neyman-Jones, wept in disappointment at the premiere, particularly when hearing the woman's dubbed voice instead of her own. Jones said that she was "all excited," when she came on the screen, until she heard the dubbed voice, at which point she "just sat there and cried.'' Mahree laughed throughout the screening at the film's ridiculousness.

Following the premiere, Warren thought Manos was the worst film ever made, but was proud of it. He suggested that its audio might be re-dubbed into a passable comedy. The film was briefly distributed by Emerson Film Enterprises, with a brief theatrical run at the Capri Theater, and at various drive-in theaters in West Texas. The only compensation was giving Jones a bicycle and giving her family dog's 50 pounds of dog food. Although the film received poor reception, Warren won his bet against Stirling Silliphant, proving that he was capable of creating an entire film. Warren pitched another script he had written called Wild Desert Bikers, and then pitched its novelization, but with the failure of Manos, there was no interest. Warren died on December 26, 1985, from lung cancer and heart problems. The majority of the cast and crew never appeared in another film, though Mahree had a successful modeling career as Diane Adelson.

Following few local screenings, Manos was almost entirely forgotten. When Jones attended the University of California, Berkeley, her friends could not find a copy of the film. A 1980 magazine article by cinematographer Bob Guidry's ex-wife Pat Ellis Taylor reports the film may have appeared on a local television station and that it was "listed at the bottom of a page in a film catalogue for rent for $20.00".

== Reception and legacy ==
=== Critical reception ===
The day after the premiere, Betty Pierce, the film reviewer of the El Paso Herald-Post, described it as a "brave experiment". She criticized some elements, such as the "hero" Torgo being "massaged to death" by the Master's wives and Margaret's claim of "it's getting dark" with a bright midday sun. In 2005, Dan Neil of the Los Angeles Times explained the film's appeal: "After screening Manos for probably the 10th time, I've concluded it has to do with intimacy. Because it is such a pure slice of Warren's brain – he wrote, directed, produced and starred, and brooked no collaboration – Manos amounts to the man's cinematically transfigured subconscious." In 2008, the founder of IMDb, Col Needham, said that Manos was the "worst he's ever endured." Manos buff Bobby Thompson said, "It's like a train wreck — you just can't take your eyes off it." Gael Fashingbauer Cooper of NBC News said "Even its title is mockable", because "Manos" means "hands" in Spanish, the title translates to "Hands: The Hands of Fate."

On review aggregator website Rotten Tomatoes, the film has an approval rating of 0% based on 15 reviews, with an average rating of 2.56/10. On IMDb, Manos is listed on the "Bottom 100", a list of the 100 worst-rated films on the website. The film has been criticized for its editing, visuals, plot, pacing, acting, and dubbing. The book Hollywood's Most Wanted lists Manos as the #2 in the list of "The Worst Movies Ever Made", following Plan 9 from Outer Space. Entertainment Weekly proclaimed Manos "The Worst Movie Ever Made". The scene in which the seven-year-old Debbie becomes a wife of the Master, played by her real father, was included in a list of "The Most Disgusting Things We've Ever Seen" by the Mystery Science Theater 3000 crew. In retrospect, Francis Rizzo III of DVD Talk said that John Reynolds "left behind quite a memorable performance, no matter how awful it was."

=== Mystery Science Theater 3000 ===
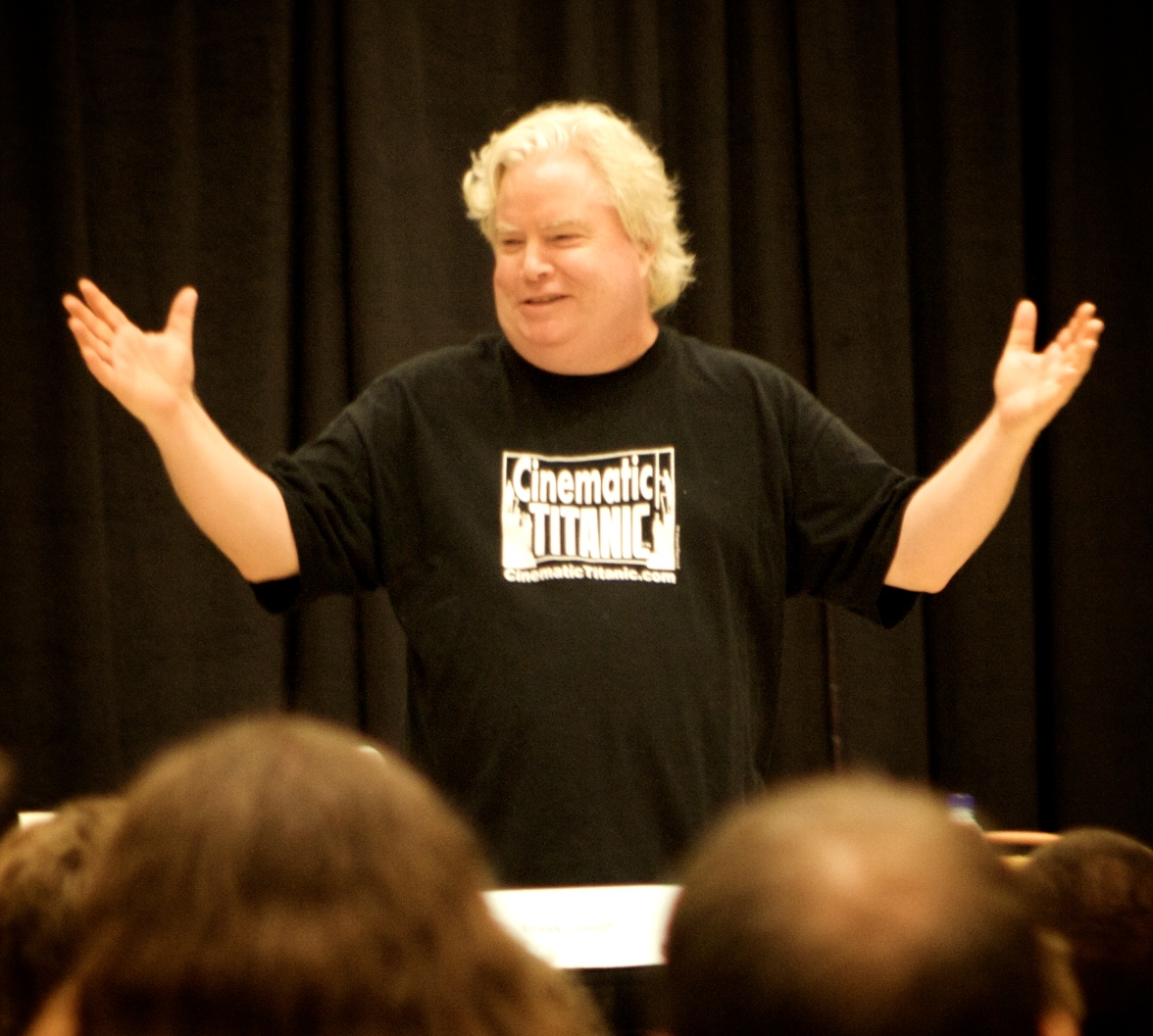
Frank Conniff chose Manos to be featured on Mystery Science Theater 3000

Mystery Science Theater 3000 (MST3K) is a Minneapolis-based television show about a crew held captive in outer space by two mad scientists, and forced to watch and mock bad movies such as B movies. The writers were going through a box of tapes, which included Manos, that was sent from Comedy Central. On January 30, 1993, the film was featured on the fourth season finale of the series. Joel Hodgson saying that "Every frame of this movie looks like someone's last known photograph," has been used by many sources to summarize the episode. The film was "so gloriously terrible" that the scientists were forced to apologise to the MST3K crew. Michael J. Nelson portrayed Torgo in several other MST3K episodes in the skits shown between the movie sections.

Selection of Manos for the show is credited to writer Frank Conniff, who also plays TV's Frank in the show. Conniff felt the movie "seemed like it was maybe a crime against humanity, but you couldn't be sure" and "has an atmosphere, a vibe" that made it appropriate for the show. The Manos episode has been described as one of the most popular of the MST3K series by Entertainment Weekly, and as the funniest by CraveOnline. Joe Blevins of A.V. Club said it was "one of the most infamous and beloved episodes". The episode is credited with bringing to light the otherwise obscure film.

During a Q&A session at the 2008 San Diego Comic-Con, the crew of MST3K said that the only film that was worse than Manos, was the 1938 film Child Bride. It was described by the crew as "appalachian kiddie porn from the '30s". The film never made it onto the show. Manos has also been riffed on by RiffTrax, a later project of MST3K alumni Michael Nelson, Kevin Murphy and Bill Corbett, during a live show in August 2012. While Nelson and Murphy were part of the cast when MST3K riffed on Manos, neither did Corbett nor their writers were involved in the original episode. While hesitant to revisit Manos, they decided to do it after being the most requested film by fans. Nelson also said would give "a fresh take" on the film.

After the episode of MST3K, Manos was introduced to a bigger audience and developed a cult following, that gave it the cult reputation as one of the worst films ever made. The MST3K appearance also resulted in several home video releases of the film. In 2004, a group of Canadians released a documentary about the film titled Hotel Torgo. According to NBC News, Torgo is a fan-favorite character by MST3K fans. In March 2015, the Elementary episode "T-Bone And The Iceman" references the physical features of Torgo to compose a fake facial composite to get the NYPD off their trail.

== Restoration ==
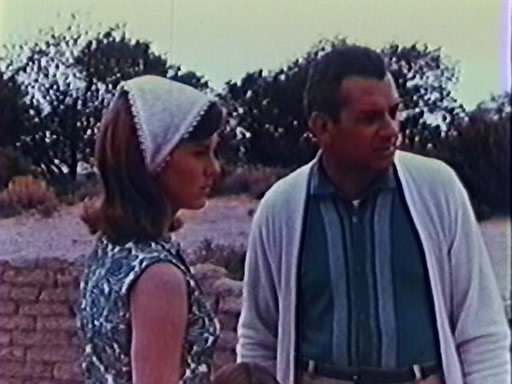
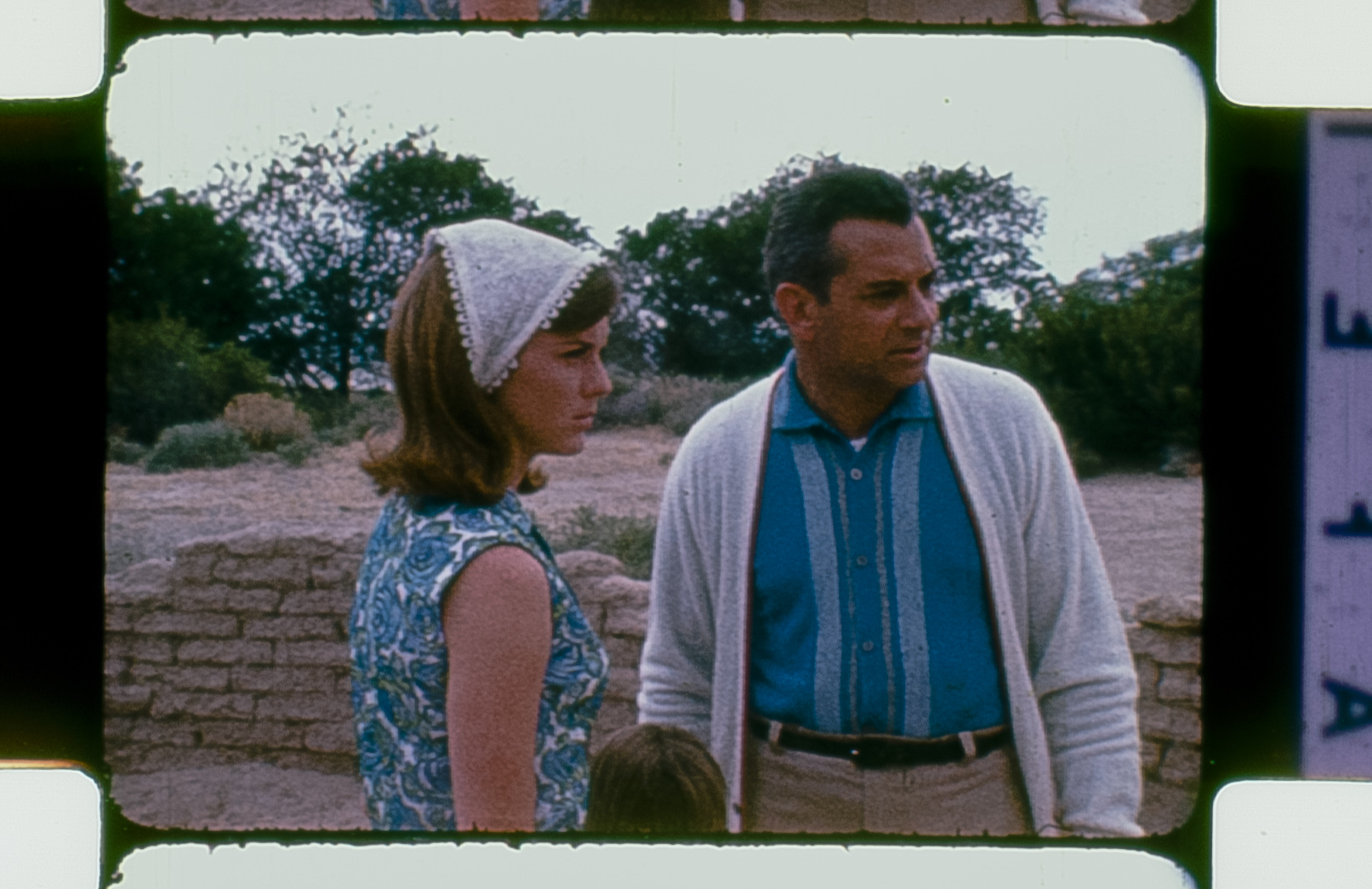
Comparison of the print found in various prior releases (left) and the Solovey workprint found in 2011 (right)

In 2011, the original 16mm workprint of Manos: The Hands of Fate was discovered by Ben Solovey, a Florida State film school graduate, in a collection of 16 mm films. He started the Kickstarter campaign, "Manos: The Restoration," where Solovey announced his intention to preserve and restore Manos for a Blu-ray release. The campaign raised $48,000, nearly five times the initial goal. A 90% finished print was premiered at the El Paso Plaza Theatre, near the original premiere in 1966. When Manos was riffed on by RiffTrax, they used the cleaned-up print for the live show.

=== Copyright dispute ===
Manos is in the public domain because director Harold Warren failed to include a copyright notice in the film. During the restoration, Solovey consulted lawyer Ian Friedman, who also believed it was in the public domain. After learning about Solovey's restoration, Joe Warren, the son of Harold Warren, started exploring the possibility that the film was not in the public domain, seeking to prevent others from profiting from his father's work. In 2013, Warren discovered that the script had a copyright notice for the screenplay. The Library of Congress records confirmed that the script was copyrighted and registered, and he believes that this copyright also applies to the film. No precedent exists for this case so the legal status of the film is uncertain. Solovey applied copyright on his restored version, an action that Warren believes is "not enforceable", though has not sought any legal action against Solovey. Warren filed a pending publication of a trademark on the phrase "Manos: The Hands of Fate," which could have impacted various fan-works by being subject to legal challenge if approved. A GoFundMe was started to challenge Warren's patent. The trademark filing has since been abandoned as of December 6, 2018, for a "failure to respond or late response".

=== Home media ===
After its MST3K appearance, Manos: The Hands of Fate was then released in several home video releases. They include releases of the original film and the MST3K episode. The MST3K episode featuring the film was released on DVD in 2001, and in the Mystery Science Theater 3000 Essentials collection in 2004. The film itself was published by Alpha Video. In September 2011, Shout Factory released a special edition with both the episode and the original film. The restoration was released on Blu-ray by Synapse Films on October 13, 2015, with an unrestored version ("Grindhouse") as one of the bonus features.

== Other media ==
=== Live performances ===
Four stage adaptations of the film have been made. In early 2006, an abridged stage version was given in Portland, Oregon. In November 2007, a musical titled Manos: Rock Opera of Fate, was launched. A puppet musical titled Manos – The Hands of Felt, was performed by Puppet This in Seattle in April 2011. After raising funds with a Kickstarter campaign in May 2013, Manos – The Hands of Felt was performed again in Seattle by Vox Fabuli Puppets in August 2013 and filmed for DVD release. Another stage version was released in Portland, Oregon in April 2013.

=== Films and television ===
In 2011, writer and director Rupert Talbot Munch, Sr. began work on Manos: The Search for Valley Lodge. Tom Neyman, his daughter Jackey Neyman-Jones, Diane Mahree, and Bernie Rosenblum were involved in initial filming. Others engaged to appear included World Wrestling Entertainment star Gene Snitsky, former WWE diva and Playboy centerfold Maria Kanellis, and UFC fighter Ryan "Big Deal" Jimmo. Munch was to play Torgo. In 2013, Jones left the project after disagreements between the cast and crew, and by the end of 2014, the project was canceled. Also in 2013, a project began for a prequel titled Manos: The Rise of Torgo. David Roy was announced as the writer and director, and cast members were to include Jones. It was released in 2018.

Jones launched a Kickstarter campaign in February 2016 to make a sequel titled Manos Returns. According to Jones, the sequel was not to be a recreation of Manos but instead a "tongue-in-cheek" setting within the Manos storyline. The Kickstarter had a goal of $24,000. It stars Jones, reprising her role as Debbie; her father Tom Neyman, reprising his role as the Master; and Diane Mahree reprising her role as Margaret. Jones and director Tonjia Atomic shot the film in western Oregon in July 2016. The film had its world premiere screening at Crypticon Seattle on May 4, 2018. Manos Returns was published on Amazon Prime in May 2020.

A television series titled The Manos Chronicles was distributed in 2023. It was created by Willow Polson and stars Jones reprising her role as Debbie. Jones is the only cast member from the original film to appear in all the Manos projects.

=== Video game ===
A video game based on the film for iOS was released in 2012 by FreakZone Games. The game is a platform game, with retro graphics and sound inspired by the 8-bit era for the Nintendo Entertainment System. It features Mike, a husband and father who attempts to expunge a man known as "The Master" in order to escape a lodge and rescue his family. Manos: The Hands of Fate has received mixed reviews from critics. It was later ported to Android.

== See also ==
- List of American films of 1966
- List of cult films
- List of films considered the worst
- Z movie
