= Manos Returns =

- Film poster
- Directed by: Tonjia Atomic
- Written by: Tonjia Atomic; Rachel Jackson; Jackey Neyman Jones
- Produced by: Tonjia Atomic; Rachel Jackson; Jackey Neyman Jones; Joe Sherlock
- Starring: Jackey Neyman Jones; Tom Neyman; Diane Adelson; Steven Shields
- Cinematography: Joe Sherlock
- Edited by: Derrick Carey
- Release date: May 4, 2018
- Running time: 67 minutes
- Country: United States
- Language: English
- Budget: $19,000, est.

Manos Returns is a 2018 comedy horror film, and sequel to the 1966 cult film Manos: The Hands of Fate by Harold P. Warren. Directed by Tonjia Atomic, many roles are reprised, including by Jackey Neyman Jones, Tom Neyman, and Diane Adelson.

== Plot ==
Four friends are lost on a road trip, finding the house of a hidden cult that worships a being named Manos. They are led by the Master and his loyal servant, Torgo.

== Cast ==
- Jackey Neyman Jones as Debbie
- Diane Adelson (credited Diane Mahree Rystad) as Maggie
- Tom Neyman as the Master
- Steven Shields as Torgo
- Danielle Daggerty as Clara
- Christina Pezzo as Nicki
- Christopher Barnes as Jay
- Nuria Aguilar as Pat
- Rachel Jackson as Lenore
- Bryan Jennings as Sheriff Jennings

== Production ==
Diane Mahree holding then seven-year-old Jackey Neyman-Jones from Manos: The Hands of Fate (1966). They both reprise their roles in Manos Returns

Jackey Neyman-Jones, who played Debbie in the original film, launched a Kickstarter campaign in February 2016 to make a sequel. She said it was not to be a recreation, but a "tongue-in-cheek" setting within the original storyline. She described the planned product as both funny and scary, like The Cabin in the Woods or Abbott and Costello Meet Frankenstein.

The Kickstarter goal of $24,000 was reached on February 24, 2016, and filming began. Neyman-Jones reprised her role as Debbie, her father Tom Neyman reprised his role of the Master, and Diane Mahree reprised her role as Margaret. Neyman-Jones and director Tonjia Atomic shot the film in western Oregon in mid-2016. Its world premiere screening was at Crypticon Seattle on May 4, 2018. Manos Returns entered Amazon Prime streaming in May 2020.
