= DaVinci International Film Festival =

Annual film festival

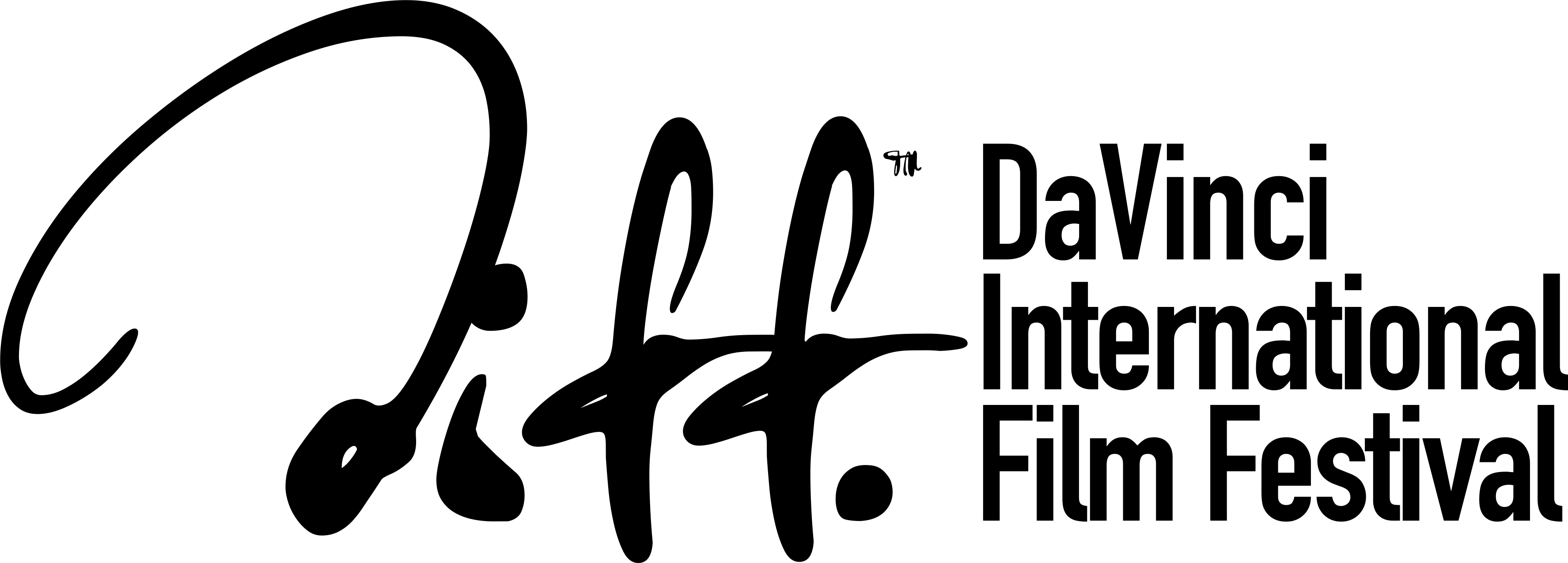

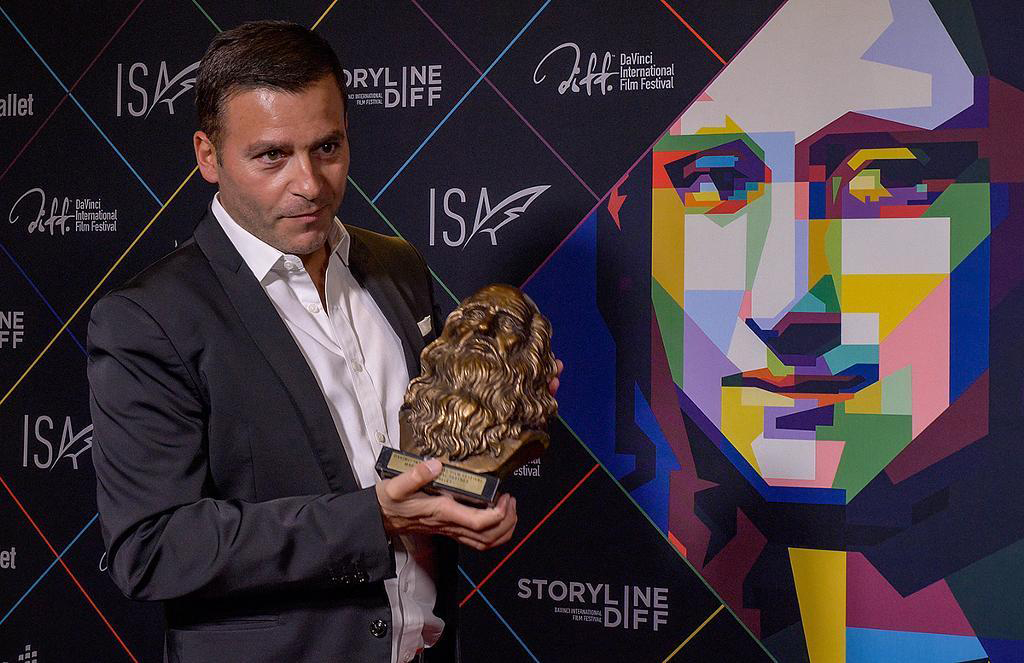
- Location: Los Angeles, California
- Founded: 2017
- Founded by: Chadwick Pelletier
- Awards: Leo Award, Visionary Award
- Language: International
- Website: davincifilm.org

The DaVinci International Film Festival (DIFF) is held annually in Los Angeles, California and is produced by the non-profit DaVinci Film Society Inc. The festival hosts four signature programs including their screenwriting competition series, Storyline, presented by Final Draft, DaVinci Labs, which honors burgeoning filmmakers with screenings and scholarships formally held at The Kennedy Center in Washington DC, a GENiUS program for ultra-short cinema, and documentaries at DIFFdocs.

DIFF qualifies and awards contemporary independent narrative, short, animation, documentary, and screenplay's, with their Official Selections. Filmmakers and screenwriters present in-competition for the festival's Leo Award at their annual event hosted at The Grove at Farmers Market. Competitive juried categories include Women In Film, Native American, military, and student film.

Special screenings for DIFF's VIP's have included the Consul (representative) of Azerbaijan, Monaco, India, and Russia.

The DaVinci Film Society, under the banner of the international film festival, hosted its inaugural DaVinci Masquerade on May 16, 2025 at Carlton Cannes Hotel during the Cannes Film Festival in support of the organizations global brand expansion into Europe and other countries, including the platform's FilmAfrica initiative in Nairobi, Kenya, 2026.

== History ==
The DaVinci International Film Festival was founded in 2017 by filmmaker and Creative Director Chadwick Pelletier.

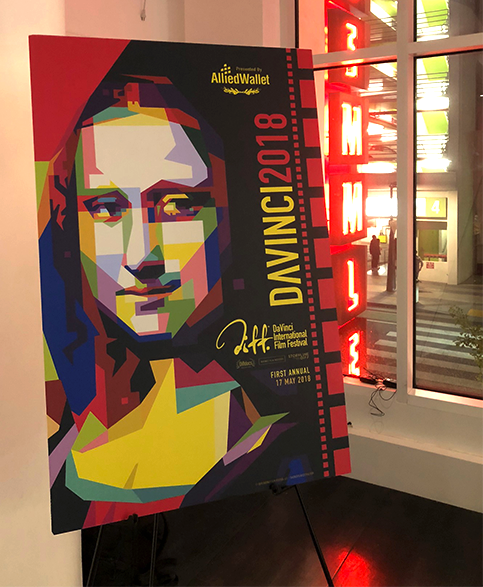
Inaugural festival at Laemmle Theaters in Santa Monica, CA.

DIFF's inaugural event was hosted at the historic Laemmle Theaters in Santa Monica, California on May 17, 2018 and was awarded FilmFreeway's Top 100 Best Reviewed film festival, screening Tracktown starring Olympic athlete, Alexi Pappas, Money, starring Jesse Williams (actor), Rumble: The Indians Who Rocked the World, and Honor Council, written and directed by Nicholl Fellowships in Screenwriting winner, Scott Simonsen.

== Second Edition ==
DIFF hosted its 2019 festival at Raleigh Studios in Hollywood, California, expanding its award categories to include documentary filmmaking under DIFFdocs and presenting its first Leo Award to documentarian, Herbert Golder for his film Ballad of a Righteous Merchant starring Werner Herzog, William Dafoe, and Michael Shannon. Other winning films in the narrative category included Aberne by Irati Santiago Mujika and I'm F%$#ing Fine by writer-director Jamie Anderson, starring Bree Turner.

== Third Edition ==
DaVinci International Film Festival's 3rd Edition was hosted online as a virtual fest, September 10-13th, 2020 due to the COVID-19 pandemic. Among the winners were The Cuban, Anna, Birds of Passage (film), Bluebird, and Mosul (2019 action film). DIFF's Leo Award in the animation category went to Malakout, directed by Farnooshh Abedi. Also in 2020, the DaVinci International Film festival introduced an all-new Ultra-Short Shelter-in-place program called COVIDaVINCI, which opened entries to amateur filmmakers around the world for an opportunity to be screened at DIFF's virtual festival. In 2022, the festival rebranded the ultra-short program as GENiUS.

== Fourth Edition ==
Due to the SARS-CoV-2 Delta variant, DaVinci International Film Festival hosted its 4th Edition online, October 10–15, 2021. Leo Award winners included The Last Tour by director Douglas Pedro Sánchez, The Criminals in the narrative short film category, which also won the Special Jury Award for screenwriting at Sundance Film Festival, Max Steiner: Maestro of Movie Magic, Iara Lee's short documentary From Trash to Treasure: Turning Negatives into Positives, and GON: The Little Fox for best animation film by Japan director, Takeshi Yashiro.

== Fifth Edition ==
DaVinci International Film Festival's 5th Edition announced its partnership with AMC Theatres at The Grove at Farmers Market and was held September 24–25, 2022. In addition to its regular programming, the festival introduced all-new panel events including Film Canada presented by industry leader, William F. White International and Digital Hollywood, which invited actor and Executive Producer, Aleks Paunovic and business partner, Neil Stevenson-Moore to discuss NFT's, blockchain, and how the new tech is disrupting Hollywood traditional financial systems. Founder and President, Chadwick Pelletier presented DIFF's first-ever Honorary Leo Award to Destination Angels, a multi-media Jack Kerouac Centennial documentary event, directed by Daniel Lir and produced by Grammy Award winning musical artist, Dru DeCaro. Among some of the titles in competition were Sylvester Stallone's MVP. New Zealand'sThe Justice of Bunny King (Leo Award Winner), a Valerie Perrine documentary, and Tough Ain't Enough, which documents two-time Academy Award winning producer, Albert S. Ruddy and his work on such films as Hogan's Heroes, The Godfather, and Million Dollar Baby, among others.

== Sixth Edition ==
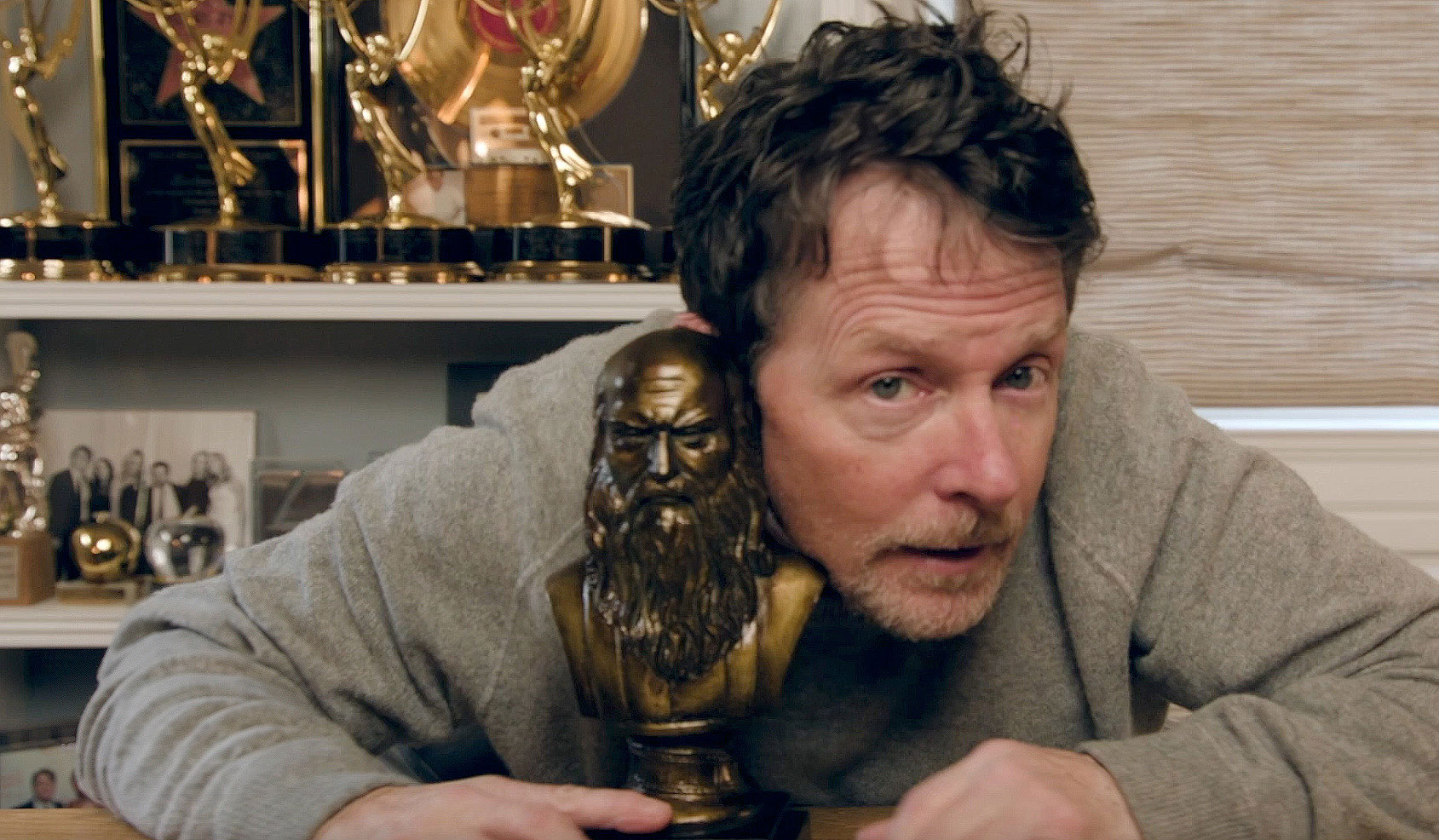
Michael J. Fox, Visionary Award® 2024

DaVinci International Film Festival's 6th Edition was postponed from its original date in October 2023 to February 23–25, 2024 due to the 2023 Writers Guild of America strike.

The 6th DaVinci International Film Festival (DIFF) opened on February 23, 2024, at The Grove in Los Angeles, California, with a screening of "In Fidelity" starring Dennis Haysbert, Willow Shields, and Chris Parnell. Over the following three days, the festival showcased independent cinema from around the world and hosted various industry panels. These events included FilmBC, FilmAsia, and The Writers' Corner, alongside new additions for 2024 such as The Creativity Conference and the Junior Leo Awards.

On February 25, the festival concluded with its Awards Ceremony, unveiling a new Leo Award bust statue and presenting awards in categories spanning feature, short, documentary, animation, and screenwriting. Additionally, Michael J. Fox was honored with the inaugural Visionary Award for his contributions to cinema and his work through the Michael J. Fox Foundation.

A representative from the Michael J. Fox Foundation received a donation from British Columbia Delorean in the amount of $10,000.00, presented by DIFF CEO and Founder, Chadwick Pelletier, at the closing Award Ceremony.

== Seventh Edition ==
The 7th Edition of the DaVinci International Film Festival was held from October 10 to 12, 2025, at AMC Theaters at The Grove in Los Angeles. The festival's opening night on October 10 was dedicated to the launch of its new initiative, FilmAfrica, designed to promote African cinema. The evening began with a red carpet attended by consulate generals from several nations, including South Africa, Togo, Kenya, Croatia, and Egypt.

The opening feature was Nawi (film), Kenya's official submission to the 97th Academy Awards, which went on to win the festival's coveted Leo Award for Best Feature Film, presented by Kenya's Consulate General, Ezra Chiloba. The festival also hosted a key panel event, "Score & More: Composing the Cinematic Experience," featuring Emmy-nominated composer Pinar Toprak, who is known for being the first woman to score a major superhero movie, Marvel Studios' Captain Marvel.

During the event, the Honorary Leo Award, celebrating outstanding achievements in independent cinema, was presented to actor Emile Hirsch by DIFF Founder & CEO, Chadwick Pelletier. The festival's program also included screenings of several short films qualified for consideration for the 98th Academy Awards, such as Don't Be Late, Myra, The Persian Rug, and the short documentary Swimming with Butterflies.

== Eighth Edition ==
Randall Wallace, Visionary Award® 2026

The 8th Edition of the DaVinci International Film Festival was held from September 25 to 26, 2026, at AMC Theaters at The Grove in Los Angeles. Founder and Executive Director Chadwick Pelletier spearheaded the landmark event, which featured a presentation of their Visionary Award to Academy Award-nominated writer-director Randall Wallace and their all-new impact initiative, RiseUP.

Opening night featured a retrospective screening of Mel Gibson's Braveheart, followed by an exclusive Q&A session. The evening culminated in the presentation of the festival's Visionary Award to Randall Wallace, presented by British Consul General, Paul Rennie OBE.

The festival also highlighted its signature DaVinci Storyline screenwriting competition through the Writers' Corner program, which featured live script readings by professional actors and an industry panel. The event hosted prominent professional screenwriters, including Creighton Rothenberger (Olympus Has Fallen, The Expendables 3), Barbara Stepansky (Outlander (TV series)), and John Macinnes (Call of Duty).

The festival concluded with major category winners, including the inaugural RecFest Black Diamond Award, presented to Zahir, for their all-new sports short documentary category. Additional recognition included the Leo Award for Best Short Film, accepted by acclaimed actress Shohreh Aghdashloo for Farewell Day.

== FilmAfrica ==
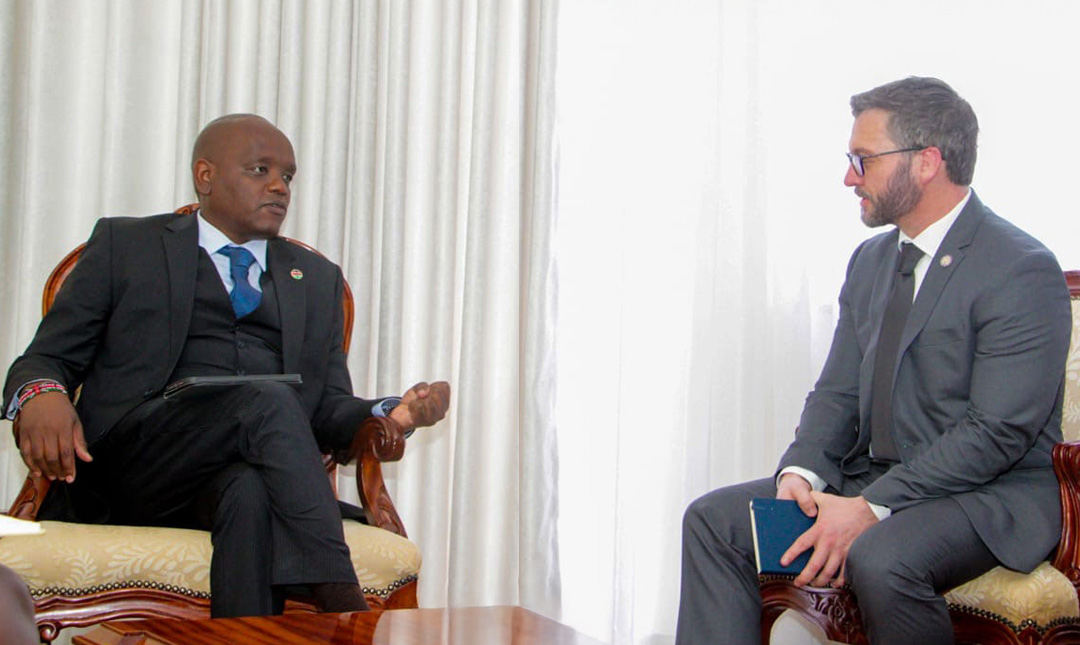
DIFF Founder & CEO, Chadwick Pelletier with Kenya Government Official, Dennis Itumbi

FilmAfrica is a new initiative from the DaVinci International Film Festival, partnering with Swahili Village Group. Launching at the seventh edition in October 2025 in Los Angeles, California, FilmAfrica will promote African cinema and filmmakers.

The program includes the introduction of independent African films at the DaVinci International Film Festival, followed by a new, independent awards platform in Nairobi, Kenya, in 2026, supported by the Kenyan government and Kenya Film Commission. This Nairobi festival aims to be a key platform for African storytellers.

FilmAfrica expands the DaVinci's scope to highlight African cinema, with the Swahili Village Group partnership emphasizing cultural exchange.

== DaVinci Masquerade ==
The DaVinci Masquerade is an exclusive, black-tie event hosted by the nonprofit 501(c)3 DaVinci Film Society at The Carlton Cannes Hotel during the Cannes Film Festival. The inaugural masquerade was held on May 16, 2025. This event draws inspiration from contemporary Venetian masquerade balls, encouraging gues';ts to embrace an air of mystery and elegance. Functioning as an invite-only affair, ticket proceeds directly support the Society's initiatives to foster independent arts and sciences. A significant announcement from the May 16th event included the DaVinci International Film Festival's partnership with the Kenya Film Commission, establishing FilmAfrica in Nairobi in 2026 to support African filmmaking in the region.

== Awards ==
DaVinci International Film Festival honors independent filmmakers and screenwriters with Official Selections, Vitruvian and Leo Awards.

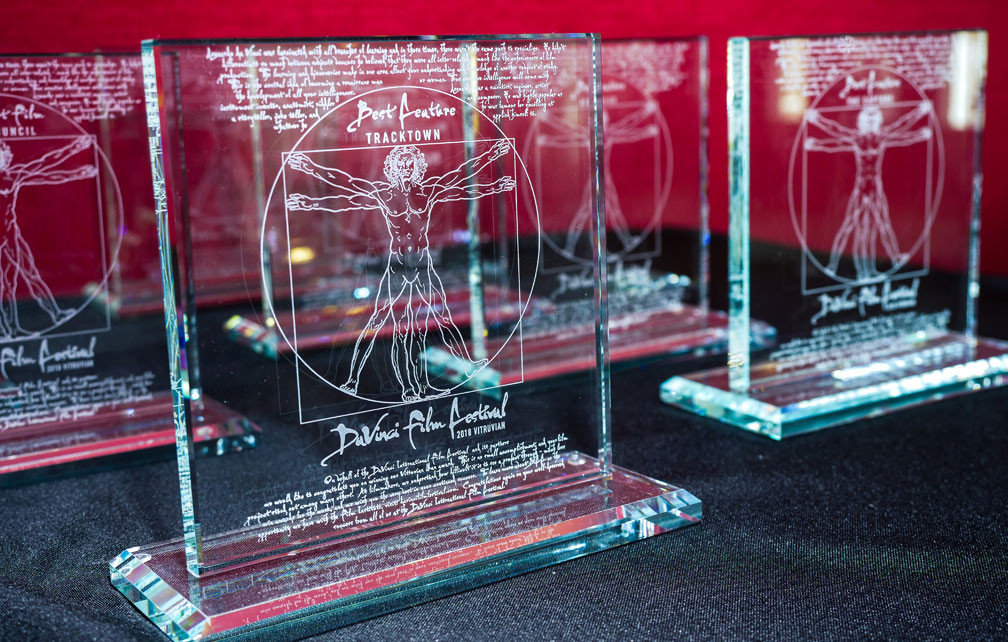
DIFF Vitruvian Awards

=== Visionary Award ===
DIFF's inaugural Visionary Award was presented to Michael J. Fox on February 25, 2024 at the 6th Edition of the DaVinci International Film Festival.

=== Leo Award ===
DIFF's Leonardo da Vinci bust statue is awarded to Best of Fest in each in-competition category and is the highest honor at the international film festival.

=== Vitruvian Award ===
Named after Leonardo da Vinci's Vitruvian Man, DIFF's Vitruvian Award is given to quarterly winners in narrative, animation, documentary, and screenwriting categories. DIFF discontinued the quarterly award in 2019.

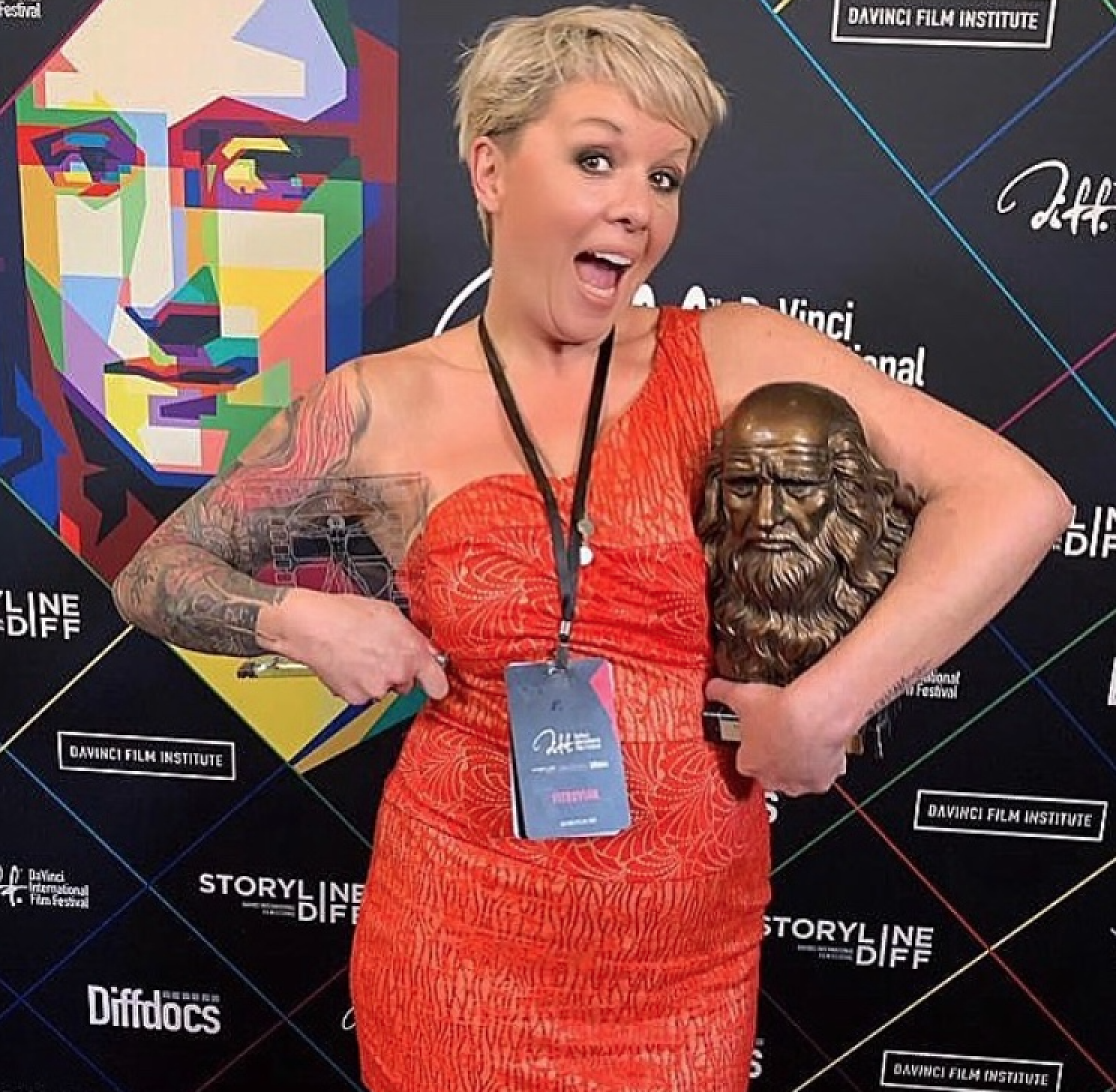
2019 Leo Award, Rwanda

=== Honorary Leo Award ===
Each year, the DaVinci International Film Festival's Board of Directors honors special achievements in independent film and philanthropy. Among the recipients include CEO and Entrepreneur, Andy Khawaja of Allied Wallet, Daniel Lir for his Jack Kerouac Centennial documentary, Destination Angeles, and actor Emile Hirsch for outstanding contribution to independent cinema, at DaVinci's 7th Edition, October 2025.

== Organization ==
The festival has a presence in both the United States and in Europe, and is currently operated by Founder and CEO, Chadwick Pelletier and the nonprofit Board of Directors. The festival's international Advisory Board representatives are located in France and Monaco.

=== Non-profit and Mission ===
DaVinci Film Society Inc. was recognized as a registered 501(c)3 nonprofit in 2019 with a mission statement aimed to cultivate and honor independent creatives across multiple disciplines in the arts and sciences. According to Pelletier: "DIFF's format was largely modeled after the luminary, Leonardo da Vinci, hence the name," he said. "Our goal at DIFF is to honor the independent creative -- across domains -- and celebrate divergent and meaningful Works with a long-term objective to create a competitive and boutique version of Venice Biennale,” he concluded.
