= Neil Moore =

Neil Moore may refer to:

- Neil Moore (footballer)
- Neil Moore (musician)

== See also ==
- Neil Stevenson-Moore, Canadian ice hockey player
- Neal Moore, American writer and canoeist
