= Glowflare Horror Film Festival =

Film festival

- Location: Yorkshire, United Kingdom
- Founded: 2024
- Founded by: Daniel Smales
- Awards: 20
- Hosted by: Parkway Cinemas
- Language: English
- Website: www.glowflarehorrorfestival.com

Glowflare Horror Film Festival is an independent horror film festival founded in 2024 by Daniel Smales, is produced and presented by Glowflare. The festival celebrates the art of filmmaking in horror genres, offering a platform for independent filmmakers from the UK and internationally to showcase their work. The festival took place in Beverley, United Kingdom. The event has been hosted since 2025 at Parkway Cinemas an independent cinema known for its modern facilities and support for independent film events.

The festival welcomes short and feature length films of horror genre and sub genres. Submissions are managed through FilmFreeway, a platform that simplifies the process for filmmakers to submit their works to festivals.

== History ==
Founded in 2024, submissions for the inaugural event were opened exclusively through FilmFreeway on 11 August 2024. The festival was announced publicly by Daniel Smales, the festival director, in April 2025. The festival accepted both short (under 40 minutes) and feature-length films, with submissions categorised under animation, comedy, folk horror, found footage, gore/extreme, monster/creature, psychological, science fiction/fantasy, slasher, supernatural, and zombie. Tickets for the first festival were made available through the Parkway Cinemas website on 4 April 2025. Final submissions was accepted until 18 April 2024. Submissions included works from both local and international filmmakers, with entries from the United States, Canada, and Europe, highlighting the festival's openness to international participation.

"All This Time," "The Reign of Queen Ginnarra," and "The Cellar" were announced as part of the first official selections for the 2025 Glowflare Horror Film Festival, as reported by the Yorkshire Times. The official trailer for the 2025 Glowflare Horror Film Festival was released on 10 May 2025 on YouTube, offering a preview of the films and events scheduled for the festival's inaugural edition. The final line-up was announced on 12 May 2025. The 2025 programme featured films produced across a wide range of budgets, from no-budget shorts to feature films completed for up to $350,000 (approximately £280,000), reflecting the diversity of production scales in independent horror filmmaking. Award nominations was announced on 13 May 2025.

The short film "Sour Tooth" by Inverclyde-based filmmakers Scott McIntosh, Cameron McDonald, and Rachael McAlonan premiered at the 2025 Glowflare Horror Film Festival, where it was nominated for Best Editing and Best Film Made for Under £1,000. The festival concluded with an awards ceremony on 18 May, where All This Time won Best Feature Film, Best Director (Rob Worsey), Best Actor (Daniel De Bourg), and the Audience Choice Award for Best Feature. Other winners included Tears of Sorrow for Best Short Film, and Lost Angels for Best Screenplay and Best Editing.

Submissions opened for its 2026 season on 1 May 2025, reflecting its intention to become a recurring event on the film festival calendar.

In August 2026, Glowflare Horror Film Festival became a member of the Film Festival Alliance.

== Official Selection ==
The following is the list of films selected for the inaugural Glowflare Horror Film Festival in 2025:

2025 Season (17-18 May 2025)
Project	Director(s)	Runtime	Type	Country
All This Time	Rob Worsey	1:29:00	Feature	United Kingdom
Blood on the Bleachers	Chase Dudley	13:40	Feature	United States
Candy	Giuseppe Marino	16:03	Short	Italy
Chainsaws Were Singing	Sander Maran	1:57:33	Feature	Estonia
Disease	Alex Masciotra-Milstein	4:58	Short	Canada
Evil Dinner	Jose Murzia	10:10	Short	Mexico
Firecrow	Markham Samuels	19:55	Short	Canada
Goodnight Sweetheart	Kathrin Told	28:43	Short	United Kingdom
Gretchen	Dean Addison	18:20	Short	United Kingdom
How To Kill Monsters	Stewart Sparke	01:35:00	Feature	United Kingdom
Karen	Dean Addison & Marc Zammit	13:58	Short	United Kingdom
Lady and the Tooth	Shaun Clark	8:00	Short	United Kingdom
Lost Angels	Peder Pedersen	01:35:47	Feature	Denmark
Mother Mary	Warren Dudley	17:15	Short	United Kingdom
Rip Advisor	Ludovic Matthey	9:48	Short	Switzerland
Sanitorium	Bruno Martínez	14:00	Short	Spain
Shape in the Lake	Falko Jakobs	22:00	Short	Germany
Tears of Sorrow	Jodie R. Tuccio	7:47	Short	United States
The Abyss	Orlando Del Maestro, Josh Flower	5:51	Short	United Kingdom
The Allure	Josh Wood	13:30	Short	Canada
The Birdwatcher	Ryan Mackfall	13:40	Short	United Kingdom
The Cellar	Jamie Langlands	2:06	Feature	United Kingdom
The Dead of Winter	Stephen Graves	11:42	Short	United Kingdom
The Five Stages of…	Glenn L Lisser	06:00	Short	United Kingdom
The Reign of Queen Ginnarra	Lawrie Brewster	1:39:00	Feature	United Kingdom
The Xmascist	Andy Winward	06:58	Short	United Kingdom
Uncanny Valley	Diego Pino	9:00	Short	Venezuela

2026 Season (5-6 September 2026)
Title	Director(s)	Runtime	Type	Country
A Ghost at Gilmore House	Oliver Mitchell	1:36:04	Feature	United Kingdom
A Night at Morgrave Manor	Xavier Grehan	14:56	Short	United Kingdom
Arcana	Lester Platt	08:28	Short	United States
Archai	Eugenio villani	1:26:00	Short	Italy
Bright Eyes	Kieren Hardy	07:25	Short	United Kingdom
Crèche & Burn	Frank O'Neil	03:53	Short	United Kingdom
Exhibit B	David Gregory	13:09	Short	United Kingdom
Gumboro	Dimitris Vavatsis	21:00	Short	Greece
Hag	Brooke deRosa	13:17	Short	United States
Haunted Henry	Gary J Hewitt	10:55	Short	United Kingdom
Jimmy	David-Jan Bronsgeest	1:20:00	Feature	Netherlands
Lest We Forget	Scott Newman	16:00	Short	United Kingdom
Marrow	Jay T Grimes	10:00	Short	United Kingdom
Match	Victor Basallote	08:00	Short	Spain
Mr. Whispers	Dorian Todd, Oliver Revie, Seumas MacNeil	1:25:54	Feature	United Kingdom
Necrosectos	Javier Lozano	09:53	Short	Spain
Obsessed	cliff mello	05:00	Short	United States
Olga	Z Tennyson	15:48	Short	United Kingdom
Painted Devil	Bruno Pimentel	05:00	Short	Czech Republic
Pleased to Kill You	Adolfo Vico	13:30	Short	United Kingdom
Prey Switch	Falko Jakobs	20:00	Short	Germany
Qui Insieme	Fabio Langella	12:10	Short	Italy
Rear Road	Roberto Montalbo	16:00	Short	Spain
Script	Piero Cannata	08:10	Short	Italy
Serumel	Kate Grey	09:50	Short	United Kingdom
Shadows	Christos Nektarios Mavromatis	14:20	Short	Greece
Southern Nightmare	Charlie Steeds	1:33:15	Feature	United Kingdom
Spoiling You	Megan Tremethick	1:28:00	Feature	United Kingdom
Surprise!	Dave Gardner	10:30	Short	United Kingdom
Sweet Child of mine	Fereshteh Nezakati rezapour	14:00	Short	Canada
The Black Dog	Sophia Peaslee	12:21	Short	United States
The Caretaker	Luke Tedder	1:53:00	Feature	United Kingdom
The House on Lidderman Street	Andrew David Barker	1:20:00	Feature	United Kingdom
The Last Sleep	Federica Bertellotti	14:56	Short	Italy
The Rabbit	Dylan Hamar	10:08	Short	United States
The Severing	Nicholas Kaiden	19:23	Short	Netherlands
The Shug	Martin J . Pickering	1:26:00	Feature	United Kingdom
Undying Love	Anca Vaida	00:59	Short	United Kingdom
Virus Detected	Geoff Harmer, Chris Josty, James Plumb, James Morrissey, Charlie Bond, James Hamer-Morton, Paul Cousins, Samuel Rush	1:15:42	Feature	United Kingdom
Voodoo Party	Richard Anthony Dunford	08:23	Short	United Kingdom

== Awards ==
The festival recognises the achievements of filmmakers in variety of the following awards.

- Best Feature Film
- Best Short Film
- Best Director
- Best Screenplay
- Best Actor
- Best Actress
- Best Supporting Actor
- Best Supporting Actress
- Best Cinematography
- Best Editing
- Best Score
- Best Sound Design
- Best Special Effects (Practical or CGI)
- Best Hair & Makeup
- Best Creature Design
- Best Film Made for £50,000 or Less
- Best Film Made for £1,000 or Less
- Best Kill Scene
- Best Gorefest
- Best Villain
- Audience Choice Award(s)

Key
Award Nomination
Award Winner

(2025) Season Nominations & Award Winners
Award	Nominee / Award Winner
Best Feature Film	All This Time (Directed by Rob Worsey)
Best Feature Film	Blood on the Bleachers (Directed by Chase Dudley)
Best Feature Film	How to Kill Monsters (Directed by Stewart Sparke)
Best Feature Film	Lost Angels (Directed by Peder Pedersen)
Best Feature Film	Queen Ginnarra (Directed by Lawrie Brewster)
Best Feature Film	The Cellar (Directed by Jamie Langlands)
Best Short Film	Evil Dinner (Directed by Jose Murzia)
Best Short Film	Goodnight Sweetheart (Directed by Kathrin Told)
Best Short Film	Gretchen (Directed by Dean Addison)
Best Short Film	Mother Mary (Directed by Warren Dudley)
Best Short Film	Rip Advisor (Directed by Ludovic Matthey)
Best Short Film	Shape in the Lake (Directed by Falko Jakobs)
Best Short Film	The Abyss (Directed by Orlando Del Maestro and Josh Flower)
Best Short Film	Tears of Sorrow (Directed by Jodie R. Tuccio)
Best Director	Dean Addison (Gretchen)
Best Director	Jamie Langlands (The Cellar)
Best Director	Kathrin Told (Goodnight Sweetheart)
Best Director	Lawrie Brewster (The Reign of Queen Ginnarra)
Best Director	Markham Samuels (Firecrow)
Best Director	Peder Pedersen (Lost Angels)
Best Director	Rob Worsey (All This Time)
Best Director	Stewart Sparke (How to Kill Monsters)
Best Screenplay	All This Time (Written by Rob Worsey)
Best Screenplay	Goodnight Sweetheart (Written by Kathrin Told)
Best Screenplay	How To Kill Monsters (Written by Paul Butler and Stewart Sparke)
Best Screenplay	Lost Angels (Written by Jan Lundager Iversen)
Best Screenplay	Mother Mary (Written by Warren Dudley)
Best Screenplay	The Abyss (Written by Josh Flower)
Best Screenplay	The Cellar (Written by Jamie Langlands)
Best Screenplay	The Reign of Queen Ginnarra (Written by Lawrie Brewster & Sarah Daly)
Best Actor	Adrian Linke (Shape in the Lake)
Best Actor	Andrew Gourlay (The Reign of Queen Ginnarra)
Best Actor	Anto Sharp (Gretchen)
Best Actor	Bastien Burgi (Rip Advisor)
Best Actor	Daniel De Bourg (All This Time)
Best Actor	Leonard Patterson (Blood on the Bleachers)
Best Actor	Nathan Plumite (Firecrow)
Best Actor	Neil James (The Cellar)
Best Actress	Agnes Born (Lost Angels)
Best Actress	Angie Sutcliffe (Karen)
Best Actress	Arriana Harris (Blood on the Bleachers)
Best Actress	Emily Rose Holt (All This Time)
Best Actress	Hannah McClean (The Abyss)
Best Actress	Lyndsey Craine (How to Kill Monsters)
Best Actress	Megan Tremethick (The Reign of Queen Ginnarra)
Best Actress	Meghan Adara (The Cellar)
Best Supporting Actor	Gary Sowerby (The Xmasist)
Best Supporting Actor	Houston Buckley (Blood on the Bleachers)
Best Supporting Actor	Johnny Vivash (How To Kill Monsters)
Best Supporting Actor	Micki Stoltt (Lost Angels)
Best Supporting Actor	Stephen Corrall (The Reign of Queen Ginnarra)
Best Supporting Actor	Xavo Giménez (Sanitorium)
Best Supporting Actress	Alessandra Aulicino (Candy)
Best Supporting Actress	Charlotte Mashall (The Cellar)
Best Supporting Actress	Darcey Alice Brown (All This Time)
Best Supporting Actress	Emma Pallant (All This Time)
Best Supporting Actress	Michaela Longden (How To Kill Monsters)
Best Supporting Actress	Perrine Casper (Tears of Sorrow)
Best Cinematography	All This Time
Best Cinematography	Goodnight Sweetheart
Best Cinematography	How to Kill Monsters
Best Cinematography	Lost Angels
Best Cinematography	Shape in the Lake
Best Cinematography	The Birdwatcher
Best Cinematography	The Cellar
Best Cinematography	The Reign of Queen Ginnarra
Best Editing	All This Time
Best Editing	Goodnight Sweetheart
Best Editing	How to Kill Monsters
Best Editing	Lost Angels
Best Editing	Rip Advisor
Best Editing	Shape in the Lake
Best Editing	Sour Tooth
Best Editing	Tears of Sorrow
Best Score	All This Time
Best Score	Evil Dinner
Best Score	Firecrow
Best Score	How to Kill Monsters
Best Score	Shape in the Lake
Best Score	Tears of Sorrow
Best Score	The Birdwatcher
Best Score	The Reign of Queen Ginnarra
Best Sound Design	Gretchen
Best Sound Design	How to Kill Monsters
Best Sound Design	Lady and The Tooth
Best Sound Design	Rip Advisor
Best Sound Design	Tears of Sorrow
Best Sound Design	The Disease
Best Special Effects	Disease
Best Special Effects	Firecrow
Best Special Effects	How to Kill Monsters
Best Special Effects	Shape in the Lake
Best Special Effects	Tears of Sorrow
Best Special Effects	The Reign of Queen Ginnarra
Best Hair & Makeup	All This Time
Best Hair & Makeup	Blood on the Bleachers
Best Hair & Makeup	Goodnight Sweetheart
Best Hair & Makeup	Tears of Sorrow
Best Hair & Makeup	The Reign of Queen Ginnarra
Best Hair & Makeup	The Xmasist
Best Creature Design	Evil Dinner
Best Creature Design	Firecrow
Best Creature Design	How to Kill Monsters
Best Creature Design	Tears of Sorrow
Best Creature Design	The Reign of Queen Ginnarra
Best Creature Design	Uncanny Valley
Best Film Made for £50,000 or Less	Firecrow (Directed by Markham Samuels)
Best Film Made for £50,000 or Less	Goodnight Sweetheart (Directed by Kathrin Told)
Best Film Made for £50,000 or Less	Karen (Directed by Dean Addison & Marc Zammit)
Best Film Made for £50,000 or Less	Sanitorium (Directed by Bruno Martínez)
Best Film Made for £50,000 or Less	Tears of Sorrow (Directed by Jodie R. Tuccio)
Best Film Made for £50,000 or Less	The Cellar (Directed by Jamie Langlands)
Best Film Made for £50,000 or Less	The Dead of Winter (Directed by Stephen Graves)
Best Film Made for £50,000 or Less	Uncanny Valley (Directed by Diego Pino)
Best Film Made for £1,000 or Less	Candy (Directed by Giuseppe Marino)
Best Film Made for £1,000 or Less	Gretchen (Directed by Dean Addison)
Best Film Made for £1,000 or Less	Lady and the Tooth (Directed by Shaun Clark)
Best Film Made for £1,000 or Less	Mother Mary (Directed by Warren Dudley)
Best Film Made for £1,000 or Less	Shape in the Lake (Directed by Falko Jakobs)
Best Film Made for £1,000 or Less	Sour Tooth (Directed by Scott McIntosh)
Best Film Made for £1,000 or Less	The Abyss (Directed by Orlando Del Maestro & Josh Flower)
Best Film Made for £1,000 or Less	The Allure (Directed by Josh Wood)
Best Kill Scene	How to Kill Monsters
Best Kill Scene	Lost Angels
Best Kill Scene	Mother Mary
Best Kill Scene	Rip Advisor
Best Kill Scene	Rudi the Blood Nosed Reindeer
Best Kill Scene	Tears of Sorrow
Best Gorefest	Chainsaws Were Singing
Best Gorefest	Disease
Best Gorefest	Goodnight Sweetheart
Best Gorefest	How to Kill Monsters
Best Gorefest	Rip Advisor
Best Gorefest	Rudi the Blood Nosed Reindeer
Best Gorefest	Tears of Sorrow
Best Gorefest	The Five Stages Of
Best Villain	Angie Sutcliffe (Karen)
Best Villain	Cole Williams (Rudi the Blood Nosed Reindeer)
Best Villain	Dan De Bourg (All This Time)
Best Villain	Halo Haynes (Gretchen)
Best Villain	Megan Tremethick (The Reign of Queen Ginnarra)
Best Villain	Micki Stoltt (Lost Angels)
Best Villain	Neil James (The Cellar)
Best Villain	Perrine Casper (Tears of Sorrow)
Audience Choice	All This Time (Best Feature Film)
Audience Choice	Disease (Best Short Film)
Audience Choice	Disease (Scariest Film)
Audience Choice	How To Kill Monsters (Most Entertaining Horror)

(2026) Season Nominations
Award	Nominee / Award Winner
Best Feature Film	A Ghost at Gilmore House (Directed by Oliver Mitchell)
Best Feature Film	Jimmy (Directed by David-Jan Bronsgeest)
Best Feature Film	Mr. Whispers (Directed by Dorian Todd Oliver Revie Seumas MacNeil)
Best Feature Film	Southern Nightmare (Directed by Charlie Steeds)
Best Feature Film	Spoiling You (Directed by Megan Tremethick)
Best Feature Film	The Shug (Directed by Martin J . Pickering)
Best Short Film	A Night at Morgrave Manor (Directed by Xavier Grehan)
Best Short Film	Lest We Forget (Directed by Scott Newman)
Best Short Film	Olga (Directed by Z Tennyson)
Best Short Film	Pleased to Kill You (Directed by Adolfo Vico)
Best Short Film	Rear Road (Directed by Roberto Montalbo)
Best Short Film	Surprise! (Directed by Dave Gardner)
Best Director	A Night at Morgrave Manor (Directed by Xavier Grehan)
Best Director	Jimmy (Directed by David-Jan Bronsgeest)
Best Director	Olga (Directed by Z Tennyson)
Best Director	Pleased to Kill You (Directed by Adolfo Vico)
Best Director	Southern Nightmare (Directed by Charlie Steeds)
Best Director	Spoiling You (Directed by Megan Tremethick)
Best Screenplay	Archai (Directed by Eugenio villani)
Best Screenplay	Lest We Forget (Directed by Scott Newman)
Best Screenplay	Olga (Directed by Z Tennyson)
Best Screenplay	Pleased to Kill You (Directed by Adolfo Vico)
Best Screenplay	Qui Insieme (Directed by Fabio Langella)
Best Screenplay	Spoiling You (Directed by Megan Tremethick)
Best Actor	Ben Probert (The Caretaker)
Best Actor	Jason Adam (The House on Lidderman Street)
Best Actor	Novarro Ramon (Mr. Whispers)
Best Actor	Roberto Accornero (Archai)
Best Actor	Scot Scurlock (Southern Nightmare)
Best Actor	Stephen Kerr (Spoiling You)
Best Actress	Charlie Chan Dagelet (Jimmy)
Best Actress	Dodie Finamore (Surprise!)
Best Actress	Faith McCoy (Southern Nightmare)
Best Actress	Jasmine Box (Olga)
Best Actress	Lyndsey Craine (A Ghost at Gilmore House)
Best Actress	Megan Tremethick (Spoiling You)
Best Supporting Actor	Dorian Todd (Mr. Whispers)
Best Supporting Actor	Johnny Vivash (The House on Lidderman Street)
Best Supporting Actor	Laurence R. Harvey (Spoiling You)
Best Supporting Actor	Olivier Huband (Olga)
Best Supporting Actor	Paul Ogletree (Southern Nightmare)
Best Supporting Actor	Scott Hume (The Caretaker)
Best Supporting Actress	Amber Doig-Thorne (Virus Detected)
Best Supporting Actress	Carolina Baroni (Olga)
Best Supporting Actress	Emily Rose Holt (A Ghost at Gilmore House)
Best Supporting Actress	Iraina Han (Voodoo Party)
Best Supporting Actress	Mackenzie Larsen (The Caretaker)
Best Supporting Actress	Madison Pankey (Southern Nightmare)
Best Cinematography	A Ghost at Gilmore House (Directed by Oliver Mitchell)
Best Cinematography	A Night at Morgrave Manor (Directed by Xavier Grehan)
Best Cinematography	Archai (Directed by Eugenio villani)
Best Cinematography	Jimmy (Directed by David-Jan Bronsgeest)
Best Cinematography	Rear Road (Directed by Roberto Montalbo)
Best Cinematography	Southern Nightmare (Directed by Charlie Steeds)
Best Editing	A Ghost at Gilmore House (Directed by Oliver Mitchell)
Best Editing	A Night at Morgrave Manor (Directed by Xavier Grehan)
Best Editing	Jimmy (Directed by David-Jan Bronsgeest)
Best Editing	Mr. Whispers (Directed by Dorian Todd Oliver Revie Seumas MacNeil)
Best Editing	Southern Nightmare (Directed by Charlie Steeds)
Best Editing	Spoiling You (Directed by Megan Tremethick)
Best Score	A Ghost at Gilmore House (Directed by Oliver Mitchell)
Best Score	Archai (Directed by Eugenio villani)
Best Score	Jimmy (Directed by David-Jan Bronsgeest)
Best Score	Olga (Directed by Z Tennyson)
Best Score	Prey Switch (Directed by Falko Jakobs)
Best Score	Spoiling You (Directed by Megan Tremethick)
Best Sound Design	A Ghost at Gilmore House (Directed by Oliver Mitchell)
Best Sound Design	Arcana (Directed by Lester Platt)
Best Sound Design	Jimmy (Directed by David-Jan Bronsgeest)
Best Sound Design	Southern Nightmare (Directed by Charlie Steeds)
Best Sound Design	Spoiling You (Directed by Megan Tremethick)
Best Sound Design	The Shug (Directed by Martin J . Pickering)
Best Special Effects (Practical or CGI)	Jimmy (Directed by David-Jan Bronsgeest)
Best Special Effects (Practical or CGI)	Southern Nightmare (Directed by Charlie Steeds)
Best Special Effects (Practical or CGI)	Spoiling You (Directed by Megan Tremethick)
Best Special Effects (Practical or CGI)	Surprise! (Directed by Dave Gardner)
Best Special Effects (Practical or CGI)	The Shug (Directed by Martin J . Pickering)
Best Special Effects (Practical or CGI)	Undying Love (Directed by Anca Vaida)
Best Hair Makeup	A Ghost at Gilmore House (Directed by Oliver Mitchell)
Best Hair Makeup	Jimmy (Directed by David-Jan Bronsgeest)
Best Hair Makeup	Olga (Directed by Z Tennyson)
Best Hair Makeup	Southern Nightmare (Directed by Charlie Steeds)
Best Hair Makeup	Spoiling You (Directed by Megan Tremethick)
Best Hair Makeup	Undying Love (Directed by Anca Vaida)
Best Creature Design (Practical or CGI)	Haunted Henry (Directed by Gary J Hewitt)
Best Creature Design (Practical or CGI)	Necrosectos (Directed by Javier Lozano)
Best Creature Design (Practical or CGI)	Obsessed (Directed by Cliff Mello)
Best Creature Design (Practical or CGI)	Olga (Directed by Z Tennyson)
Best Creature Design (Practical or CGI)	The Black Dog (Directed by Sophia Peaslee)
Best Creature Design (Practical or CGI)	The Shug (Directed by Martin J . Pickering)
Best Film Made for £50000 or Less	A Night at Morgrave Manor (Directed by Xavier Grehan)
Best Film Made for £50000 or Less	Lest We Forget (Directed by Scott Newman)
Best Film Made for £50000 or Less	Olga (Directed by Z Tennyson)
Best Film Made for £50000 or Less	Surprise! (Directed by Dave Gardner)
Best Film Made for £50000 or Less	The House on Lidderman Street (Directed by Andrew David Barker)
Best Film Made for £50000 or Less	Virus Detected (Directed by Geoff Harmer Chris Josty James Plumb James Morrissey Charlie Bond James Hamer-Morton Paul Cousins Samuel Rush)
Best Film Made for £1000 or Less	Bright Eyes (Directed by Kieren Hardy)
Best Film Made for £1000 or Less	Crèche & Burn (Directed by Frank O'Neil)
Best Film Made for £1000 or Less	Painted Devil (Directed by Bruno Pimentel)
Best Film Made for £1000 or Less	Prey Switch (Directed by Falko Jakobs)
Best Film Made for £1000 or Less	Script (Directed by Piero Cannata)
Best Film Made for £1000 or Less	Undying Love (Directed by Anca Vaida)
Best Kill Scene	Jimmy (Directed by David-Jan Bronsgeest)
Best Kill Scene	Necrosectos (Directed by Javier Lozano)
Best Kill Scene	Olga (Directed by Z Tennyson)
Best Kill Scene	Southern Nightmare (Directed by Charlie Steeds)
Best Kill Scene	Surprise! (Directed by Dave Gardner)
Best Kill Scene	Voodoo Party (Directed by Richard Anthony Dunford)
Best Gorefest	Jimmy (Directed by David-Jan Bronsgeest)
Best Gorefest	Southern Nightmare (Directed by Charlie Steeds)
Best Gorefest	Spoiling You (Directed by Megan Tremethick)
Best Gorefest	Surprise! (Directed by Dave Gardner)
Best Gorefest	The Shug (Directed by Martin J . Pickering)
Best Gorefest	Voodoo Party (Directed by Richard Anthony Dunford)
Best Villain	Haunted Henry (Directed by Gary J Hewitt)
Best Villain	Jimmy (Directed by David-Jan Bronsgeest)
Best Villain	Pleased to Kill You (Directed by Adolfo Vico)
Best Villain	Southern Nightmare (Directed by Charlie Steeds)
Best Villain	Spoiling You (Directed by Megan Tremethick)
Best Villain	The Shug (Directed by Martin J . Pickering)
