= Irati =

Irati may refer to:

- Irati, Paraná, a city in the state of Paraná, Brazil.
- Irati, Santa Catarina, a city in the state of Santa Catarina, Brazil.
- Irati Forest, a forest of the western Pyrenees in the Basque Country of France and Navarre in Spain
- Irati (river), a right-hand tributary of the river Aragón
- Irati (film), a Basque-language film
- Irati (given name), a Basque feminine given name meaning “star”
