= Glowflare Short Film Festival =

Film festival

- Location: Yorkshire, United Kingdom
- Founded: 2024
- Founded by: Daniel Smales
- Awards: 16
- Hosted by: Parkway Cinemas
- Language: English
- Website: Official Website

Glowflare Short Film Festival is an independent festival founded in 2024 by Daniel Smales, is produced and presented by Glowflare. The festival celebrates the art of short filmmaking, offering a platform for independent filmmakers from the UK and abroad to showcase their work. The festival is set to take place in Beverley, United Kingdom. The events are hosted at Parkway Cinemas an independent cinema known for its modern facilities and support for independent film events.

The festival welcomes short film entities of all genres that are under 40 minutes. Submissions are managed through FilmFreeway, a platform that simplifies the process for filmmakers to submit their works to festivals.

== History ==
Founded in 2024, submissions for the inaugural event were opened exclusively through FilmFreeway on 11 August 2024. Filmmakers were invited to submit their short films in genres such as narrative, animation, documentary, music video and experimental works. The festival was announced publicly by Daniel Smales, the festival director, in October 2024. In November, it was announced that its inaugural event would be held on 25 January 2025 at Parkway Cinemas. Tickets for the first festival were made available through the Parkway Cinemas website on 11 November 2024. A final call for submissions was issued in early December 2024, with submissions closing on 13 December 2024. Submissions have included works from both local and international filmmakers, with entries from the United States, Canada, and Europe, highlighting the festival’s openness to international participation. The official line-up was announced on 30 December 2024. Selections were announced on 20 December, with award nominations announced on 6 January 2025.

Submissions for the 2026 season opened on 1 January 2025, indicating the festival’s intention to operate as a recurring event on the film festival calendar. In January 2026, the festival announced its line-up for the upcoming season, which included the introduction of three new awards: Best Student Film, Best International Film, and Best Emerging Filmmaker.

In May 2026, Glowflare Short Film Festival became a member of the Film Festival Alliance.

== Official Selection ==
The following is the list of films selected for the inaugural Glowflare Short Film Festival in 2025:

2025 Season (25 January 2025)
Project	Director(s)	Runtime	Type	Country
The Nose Knows: Foreignness and Fortune in China	Bill Callahan, Kieran Hanson	22:59	Documentary	United Kingdom
Yen For Zen	James Pyle	1:00	Animation	United Kingdom
Meeting	Martin Keady	14:00	Narrative	United Kingdom
RCA Let The Artist Talk Sam Modder	Carlos Patrick Haney	5:00	Documentary	United Kingdom
Like, Comment, Share	Nick Noyes	10:11	Narrative	United States
Bruised	Lou Burns, Aaron Burns	19:58	Experimental	United Kingdom
The Barber, The Astronaut and The Golf Ball	Jonathan Richards	25:00	Documentary	United Kingdom
Roundabout	Patrick Sheard	18:00	Narrative	United Kingdom
Der Hof	Pete Mason	10:10	Animation	United Kingdom
Novablood Biblical	Clive Tonge	4:25	Music Video	United Kingdom
The Westwood Cows	Matthew McCloud	2:48	Experimental	United Kingdom
Cry Like a Guy	Anthony Rubinstein	4:30	Experimental	United Kingdom
Turn Over	Rick Endacott	13:18	Narrative	United States
Fahrenheit 2051	Hadrien Genest	2:30	Experimental	France
The Appliance of Science	Martin Cooper	2:07	Experimental	United Kingdom
Crashlanding the Persian Mothership	Martin Cooper	29:59	Documentary	United Kingdom
Homeless Tobez	Thomas Loone	36:25	Experimental	United Kingdom
In the Matter of Brian Franks	Lauren Patrice Nadler	13:50	Narrative	United States
Te Amo Papá	Dave Brown, Jake Zieman	7:45	Narrative	United States
Takeaway	Lou Sumray	5:18	Animation	United Kingdom
Reception	Lou Sumray	2:25	Animation	United Kingdom
Trigger-ed	Tyson Green	11:12	Narrative	United Kingdom
Beholden	Leon Lopez	13:56	Narrative	United Kingdom
Gretchen	Dean Addison	18:19	Narrative	United Kingdom
Bo Jacquo	Mikaël FITOUSSI, Grégory FITOUSSI	18:40	Experimental	France
The Devil's Symphony	Andy Winward	14:36	Narrative	United Kingdom
Speaker	Alan Hamwan	6:57	Narrative	United Kingdom
Hunter Loading	Sasa Numic	7:59	Narrative	United States
Where Have I Gone?	Georgina May Haley, Elizabeth Bell	25:25	Narrative	United Kingdom
Echoes	Christina Araujo	9:15	Animation	United States
The Visit	Parmjit Kaur Gill	10:55	Narrative	United Kingdom
As We Fall Silent	Brian Quintero	20:00	Narrative	Canada
Still Here / Immerdar	John Graham	10:24	Narrative	Canada
The Dating Game	Keith Murphy	10:58	Experimental	Canada
Girl in the Shadows	Herty Owusu	15:00	Narrative	United Kingdom
Pee Fright	Matt Colin Evans	6:23	Experimental	United Kingdom
Stationary	Robin Harvey	7:38	Experimental	United Kingdom
In Half	Jorge Morais Valle	24:00	Animation	Spain
Confession	De Ville	3:00	Experimental	United States

2026 Season (18 April 2026)
Project	Director(s)	Runtime	Type	Country
A Hidden Legacy	Tom Hopper	08:47	Documentary	United Kingdom
Apocalips	Lydia Barras	07:19	Narrative	United Kingdom
Bound by Blood	Eddy Reilly	15:16	Documentary	United Kingdom
Brother	Louis Akihito	14:46	Narrative	United Kingdom
Chimp	Tristan Seever	13:04	Narrative	United States
Dance with the Reaper	Carlota Massó	04:15	Animation	Spain
Disparate Youth	Chiara Aiello	11:37	Narrative	United States
Game Changer	Paul Harker	28:45	Documentary	United Kingdom
Gan Canny	Lou Burns, Aaron Burns	17:43	Narrative	United Kingdom
Guygu	Chen Heifetz, Jordan Barr	07:11	Documentary	Israel
I Want To Go Back To Yingcheng	思淇 程 Siqi Cheng	08:29	Narrative	China
In Her Image	Dominic Ashforth	09:04	Narrative	United Kingdom
Kalaviuka	Qilu Gan	10:25	Animation	China
Kill	Ruth Sewell	05:07	Narrative	United Kingdom
Ku: A Love Story	Anita George	03:24	Animation	United States
Mantle Peace	Aidan Gibson	07:30	Narrative	Ireland
Masai Mara	Andrea Bufi	03:00	Documentary	Italy
Mod (Turn)	Amit Baidya	16:13	Narrative	India
No Strings	Molly Lipson	10:31	Narrative	United Kingdom
Partners in Crime	J. E. Dufton	14:53	Narrative	United Kingdom
Perpetuity	Danny Turner	05:55	Narrative	United Kingdom
Rat Trap	Emilia Stevens	12:33	Narrative	United Kingdom
Reparation	Jordan Dean	19:59	Narrative	United Kingdom
SALT!	Shay Thurmon	07:26	Narrative	United States
Sands of Purgatory	Alex Bates	20:41	Narrative	United Kingdom
Son		16:05	Narrative	Australia
Spectacle	Shantelle-Ellysé English	10:00	Narrative	United Kingdom
Strings Attached	Naren Gabriel Gurrier-Jones	15:20	Narrative	Australia
Tea With Friends	Farah Halime Hope	11:00	Narrative	United Kingdom
THE BOIIFRIEND – Shot Of You	Suzana Juršič ‘Suki’	02:45	Music Video	Slovenia
The Family Photo	John Norris Ray, Maria Victoria Sanchez	08:48	Animation	United States
The Irish	Jonny Gray	08:21	Narrative	United Kingdom
The Missing Part	Marv Hathim	12:02	Narrative	Netherlands
The Paper Souls	Véronique MÉRIADEC, Nathalie CAROLLO	19:11	Narrative	France
The Quiet Room	Kyle Brown	14:56	Narrative	United Kingdom
The Robe of Rainbow Feathers	Wesley Price	06:21	Animation	United States
TWAIN	Pip	15:54	Narrative	United Kingdom
UHURU	Olz McCoy	09:55	Documentary	United Kingdom
Venus Flytrap	Marc PUBREUIL	22:05	Narrative	France
Why We Pride	Benjamin Scarsbrook	08:35	Documentary	United Kingdom

== Awards ==
The festival recognises the achievements of filmmakers in variety of the following awards.

- Best Film
- Best Documentary
- Best Animation
- Best Director
- Best Screenplay
- Best Actor
- Best Actress
- Best Supporting Actor
- Best Supporting Actress
- Best Cinematography
- Best Editing
- Best Original Score
- Best Low Budget (Under £1000)
- Best Student Film
- Best International Film
- Best Emerging Filmmaker
- Audience Choice Award(s)

Key
Award Nomination
Award Winner

2025 Season Nominations & Award Winners
Award	Nominee / Award Winner
Best Film	As We Fall Silent (Directed by Brian Quintero)
Best Film	Bruised (Directed by Lou and Aaron Burns)
Best Film	Cry Like A Guy (Directed by Anthony Rubinstein)
Best Film	Gretchen (Directed by Dean Addison)
Best Film	Homeless Tobez (Directed by Thomas Loone)
Best Film	In Half (Directed by Jorge Morais Valle)
Best Documentary	Crashlanding the Persian Mothership (Directed by Martin Cooper)
Best Documentary	RCA Let The Artist Talk (Directed by Carlos Patrick Haney)
Best Documentary	The Barber, The Astronaut and The Golf Ball (Directed by Jonathan Richards)
Best Documentary	The Nose Knows: Foreignness and Fortune in China (Directed by Bill Callahan and Kieran Hanson)
Best Director	Anthony Rubinstein (Cry Like A Guy)
Best Director	Brian Quintero (As We Fall Silent)
Best Director	Dean Addison (Gretchen)
Best Director	Jorge Morais Valle (In Half)
Best Director	Lou and Aaron Burns (Bruised)
Best Director	Thomas Loone (Homeless Tobez)
Best Animation	Der Hof (Directed by Pete Mason)
Best Animation	Echoes (Directed by Christina Araujo)
Best Animation	In Half (Directed by Jorge Morais Valle)
Best Animation	Reception (Directed by Lou Sumray)
Best Animation	Take Away (Directed by Lou Sumray)
Best Animation	Yen For Zen (Directed by James Pyle)
Best Screenplay	As We Fall Silent (Lauren Wagner and Rachel Salsberg)
Best Screenplay	Bruised (Lou Burns)
Best Screenplay	Echoes (Christina Araujo)
Best Screenplay	Homeless Tobez (Thomas Loone)
Best Screenplay	In The Matter of Brian Franks (J.N. Gould)
Best Screenplay	The Visit (Parmjit Kaur Gill)
Best Actor	Anto Sharp (Gretchen)
Best Actor	Calvin Chervinko (Turn Over)
Best Actor	Hans Gurbig (Still Here)
Best Actor	Kieran Bew (Cry Like a Guy)
Best Actor	Mikaël Fitoussi (Bo Jacquo)
Best Actor	Thomas Loone (Homeless Tobez)
Best Actress	Amy Lucas (Gretchen)
Best Actress	Aria Bryan (Like, Comment and Share)
Best Actress	Becky Lindsey (Bruised)
Best Actress	Eva Bjornholt (Still Here)
Best Actress	Harriet Mardlin (Meeting)
Best Actress	Lauren Wagner (As We Fall Silent)
Best Supporting Actor	Bill Picard (Bruised)
Best Supporting Actor	Eric Moyer (Turn Over)
Best Supporting Actor	Jason Adam (Homeless Tobez)
Best Supporting Actor	Mitchell Anthony (As We Fall Silent)
Best Supporting Actor	Nick Sowma (In The Matter of Brian Franks)
Best Supporting Actor	Patrick Broderick (The Devil's Symphony)
Best Supporting Actress	Alex Kapila (The Visit)
Best Supporting Actress	Hadeesa Ramjee (Where Have I Gone)
Best Supporting Actress	Hayley Mitchell (Homeless Tobez)
Best Supporting Actress	Laura Fitzpatrick (Girl in the Shadows)
Best Supporting Actress	Louise Munro (Beholden)
Best Supporting Actress	Lucy Mynard (Roundabout)
Best Cinematography	As We Fall Silent (Justin Arjune)
Best Cinematography	Bo Jacquo (Antoine Carpentier)
Best Cinematography	Confession (Steeven Petitteville)
Best Cinematography	Cry Like A Guy (Thomas English)
Best Cinematography	Fahrenheit 2051 (Camille Barbé)
Best Cinematography	Still Here (Jonas Jehle)
Best Editing	Confession (Fernando Raigoxa and Jean-Marc Demmer)
Best Editing	Cry Like a Guy (Anthony Rubinstein)
Best Editing	Fahrenheit 2051 (Hadrien Genest)
Best Editing	Gretchen (Shaun Hodson and Dean Addison)
Best Editing	In Half (Jorge Morais Valle)
Best Editing	Speaker (Miran Omer)
Best Score	As We Fall Silent (Andrés Galindo Arteaga and Erik Arnesen)
Best Score	Confession (Fred Falke)
Best Score	Gretchen (Shaun Hodson)
Best Score	In Half (Juan Manuel Cameán)
Best Score	Still Here (Christopher Schlechte-Bond)
Best Score	The Visit (TBA)
Best Low Budget	Der Hof (Directed by Pete Mason)
Best Low Budget	Gretchen (Directed by Dean Addison)
Best Low Budget	Novablood Biblical (Directed by Clive Tonge)
Best Low Budget	Roundabout (Directed by Patrick Sheard)
Best Low Budget	Takeaway (Directed by Lou Sumray)
Best Low Budget	The Devil's Symphony (Directed by Andy Winward)
Audience Choice	Homeless Tobez (Best Film)
Audience Choice	Echoes (Best Animation)
Audience Choice	The Nose Knows: Foreignness and Fortune in China (Best Documentary)
Audience Choice	Thomas Loone (Best Director)
Audience Choice	Thomas Loone (Best Actor)
Audience Choice	Amy Lucas (Best Actress)

2026 Season Nominations & Award Winners
Award	Nominee / Award Winner
Best Film	Dance with the Reaper (Directed by Carlota Massó)
Best Film	Gan Canny (Directed by Lou Burns Aaron Burns)
Best Film	In Her Image (Directed by Dominic Ashforth)
Best Film	Reparation (Directed by Jordan Dean)
Best Film	Sands of Purgatory (Directed by Alex Bates)
Best Film	Twain (Directed by Pip)
Best Director	Gan Canny (Directed by Lou Burns Aaron Burns)
Best Director	Perpetuity (Directed by Danny Turner)
Best Director	Reparation (Directed by Jordan Dean)
Best Director	Sands of Purgatory (Directed by Alex Bates)
Best Director	Tea With Friends (Directed by Farah Halime Hope)
Best Director	Twain (Directed by Pip)
Best Screenplay	Gan Canny (Directed by Lou Burns Aaron Burns)
Best Screenplay	I Want To Go Back To Yingcheng (Directed by Siqi Cheng)
Best Screenplay	Perpetuity (Directed by Danny Turner)
Best Screenplay	Reparation (Directed by Jordan Dean)
Best Screenplay	Tea With Friends (Directed by Farah Halime Hope)
Best Screenplay	Twain (Directed by Pip)
Best Actor	Charlie Blanshard (Reparation)
Best Actor	David O'Brien (The Quiet Room)
Best Actor	Éanna Hardwicke (Twain)
Best Actor	Emmanuel Akinkuolie (Brother)
Best Actor	Gregory David (Kill)
Best Actor	Jonny Larman (Gan Canny)
Best Actress	Emma Turner (Perpetuity)
Best Actress	Jessie Bedrossian (No Strings)
Best Actress	Katie Creaghan (Partners in Crime)
Best Actress	Lily Storey (Gan Canny)
Best Actress	Richa Pallod (Mod (Turn))
Best Actress	Ruby Bentall (Tea With Friends)
Best Supporting Actor	Brandon Ashplant (Sands of Purgatory)
Best Supporting Actor	Jack Fox (Son)
Best Supporting Actor	John Lawless (Reparation)
Best Supporting Actor	Joshua Akehurst (No Strings)
Best Supporting Actor	Maxwell Whitelock (In Her Image)
Best Supporting Actor	William Parsons (Rat Trap)
Best Supporting Actress	Georgina Hope (In Her Image)
Best Supporting Actress	Hayat Kamille (Tea With Friends)
Best Supporting Actress	Rex Adams (Brother)
Best Supporting Actress	Samantha Sirriani (Disparate Youth)
Best Supporting Actress	Sapphire Brewer-Marchant (Sands of Purgatory)
Best Supporting Actress	Toni O'Rourke (Twain)
Best Documentary	A Hidden Legacy (Directed by Tom Hopper)
Best Documentary	Bound by Blood (Directed by Eddy Reilly)
Best Documentary	Game Changer (Directed by Paul Harker)
Best Documentary	Masai Mara (Directed by Andrea Bufi)
Best Documentary	UHURU (Directed by Olz McCoy)
Best Documentary	Why We Pride (Directed by Benjamin Scarsbrook)
Best Animation	Dance with the Reaper (Directed by Carlota Massó)
Best Animation	Guygu (Directed by Chen Heifetz Jordan Barr)
Best Animation	Kalaviuka (Directed by Qilu Gan)
Best Animation	Ku: A Love Story (Directed by Anita George)
Best Animation	The Family Photo (Directed by John Norris Ray Maria Victoria Sanchez)
Best Animation	The Robe of Rainbow Feathers (Directed by Wesley Price)
Best Cinematography	Gan Canny (Directed by Lou Burns Aaron Burns)
Best Cinematography	Reparation (Directed by Jordan Dean)
Best Cinematography	Sands of Purgatory (Directed by Alex Bates)
Best Cinematography	Tea With Friends (Directed by Farah Halime Hope)
Best Cinematography	Twain (Directed by Pip)
Best Cinematography	Venus Flytrap (Directed by Marc PUBREUIL)
Best Score	Dance with the Reaper (Directed by Carlota Massó)
Best Score	Gan Canny (Directed by Lou Burns Aaron Burns)
Best Score	Kalaviuka (Directed by Qilu Gan)
Best Score	Sands of Purgatory (Directed by Alex Bates)
Best Score	Tea With Friends (Directed by Farah Halime Hope)
Best Score	Venus Flytrap (Directed by Marc Pubreuil)
Best Editing	Brother (Directed by Louis Akihito)
Best Editing	Gan Canny (Directed by Lou Burns Aaron Burns)
Best Editing	In Her Image (Directed by Dominic Ashforth)
Best Editing	Reparation (Directed by Jordan Dean)
Best Editing	Sands of Purgatory (Directed by Alex Bates)
Best Editing	Twain (Directed by Pip)
Best Low Budget Under £1000	A Hidden Legacy (Directed by Tom Hopper)
Best Low Budget Under £1000	Gan Canny (Directed by Lou Burns Aaron Burns)
Best Low Budget Under £1000	In Her Image (Directed by Dominic Ashforth)
Best Low Budget Under £1000	Kill (Directed by Ruth Sewell)
Best Low Budget Under £1000	Perpetuity (Directed by Danny Turner)
Best Low Budget Under £1000	Spectacle (Directed by Shantelle-Ellysé English)
Best Student Film	Apocalips (Directed by Lydia Barras)
Best Student Film	Dance with the Reaper (Directed by Carlota Massó)
Best Student Film	I Want To Go Back To Yingcheng (Directed by Siqi Cheng)
Best Student Film	Kalaviuka (Directed by Qilu Gan)
Best Student Film	Perpetuity (Directed by Danny Turner)
Best Student Film	Rat Trap (Directed by Emilia Stevens)
Best International Film	Dance with the Reaper (Directed by Carlota Massó)
Best International Film	I Want To Go Back To Yingcheng (Directed by Siqi Cheng)
Best International Film	Mod (Turn) (Directed by Amit Baidya)
Best International Film	SALT! (Directed by Shay Thurmon)
Best International Film	The Paper Souls (Directed by Véronique MÉRIADEC Nathalie CAROLLO)
Best International Film	Venus Flytrap (Directed by Marc PUBREUIL)
Best Emerging Filmmaker	A Hidden Legacy (Directed by Tom Hopper)
Best Emerging Filmmaker	I Want To Go Back To Yingcheng (Directed by Siqi Cheng)
Best Emerging Filmmaker	In Her Image (Directed by Dominic Ashforth)
Best Emerging Filmmaker	Perpetuity (Directed by Danny Turner)
Best Emerging Filmmaker	Tea With Friends (Directed by Farah Halime Hope)
Best Emerging Filmmaker	Twain (Directed by Pip)
Audience Choice	Bound by Blood (Best Documentary)
Audience Choice	Dance with the Reaper (Best Animation)
Audience Choice	Gan Canny (Best Low Budget)
Audience Choice	In Her Image (Best Student Film)
Audience Choice	Reparation (Best Film)
Audience Choice	Strings Attached (Best International Film)
