= Glowflare =

British media and entertainment group

- Logo since 2023
- Type: Private
- Industry: Film
- Founded: May 7, 2015; 11 years ago
- Founder: Daniel Smales
- Headquarters: Hull, East Yorkshire, United Kingdom
- Products: Independent Film Festivals; Branding & Marketing; Production Company
- Brands: Glowflare Short Film Festival; Glowflare Horror Film Festival
- Website: www.glowflare.com

Glowflare (the trading name of Glowflare Limited) is a British media and entertainment group headquartered in Hull, East Yorkshire.

== History ==
Glowflare was incorporated on 7 May 2015 in England and Wales under company number 09579411.

The company initially operated in branding and post‑production support for film and media, contributing to independent titles such as Death Walks and No Reasons.

In 2024, Glowflare launched the Glowflare Short Film Festival, a UK-based international short film event. Its inaugural edition was featured on FilmFreeway and received over 40 submissions. The event received coverage by Hull What’s On and BBC News.

In 2025, the company launched the Glowflare Horror Film Festival, dedicated to international horror cinema. It received coverage from The Yorkshire Post, was featured on Hull Live, received a segment on BBC News, and was included as a listed awards event on IMDb.

By mid-2025, information became publicly available online indicating that Glowflare was developing a slate of in-house short films, including Destitute (2026) and two additional untitled projects slated for release with dates to be confirmed.

== Festivals ==
Glowflare produces two annual film festivals that support and showcase independent short films:

- The Glowflare Short Film Festival was launched in 2024 as a platform for international short-form storytelling. Its inaugural edition received regional press coverage and was featured by BBC News and Hull-based outlets.
- The Glowflare Horror Film Festival followed in 2025, dedicated to the horror genre. It gained attention from regional publications including the Yorkshire Post and Hull Live, and was later recognised as a qualifying event by IMDb.

== Film production ==
Glowflare develops and produces original short-form film content in-house. Following early support roles on external projects, the company has shifted toward its own creative slate.

=== Filmography ===
Title	Year	Status	Format	Notes
Destitute	2026	Preproduction	Short	Original in-house production
Untitled project	TBA	Announced	Short	Original in-house production
Untitled project	TBA	Announced	Short	Original in-house production
