= Irati (given name) =

- Pronunciation: /ɪˈrɑːti/ ih-RAH-tee
- Gender: Feminine
- Language: Basque

Origin
- Meaning: fern field
- Region of origin: Spain

Irati (/ɪˈrɑːti/ ih-RAH-tee) is a Basque feminine given name meaning "fern field". It was among the ten most popular names given to newborn girls in the Basque community in Spain in 2021.

== People ==
- Irati Idiakez (born 1996), Spanish para-snowboarder
- Irati Idirin (born 1994), Spanish professional racing cyclist
- Irati Martín (born 2003), Spanish footballer
- Irati Santiago Mujika (born 1991), Spanish film and video producer
