= Withoutabox =

Defunct film distribution Web site

- Website type: Film
- Available in: English
- Owner: IMDb
- Creators: David Straus, Joe Neulight
- Website: Archived official website at the Wayback Machine (archive index)
- Launched: January 2000
- Current status: Not Active

Withoutabox was a website founded in January 2000 by David Straus, Joe Neulight which allowed independent filmmakers to self-distribute their films. The first product launched was the International Film Festival Submission system. Withoutabox worked with film festivals and filmmakers all over the world. In January 2008, Withoutabox was acquired by IMDb, a subsidiary of Amazon.

The Withoutabox website offered filmmakers a platform to search over 3000 film festivals on five continents and to submit their films to over 850 film festivals worldwide, including festivals such as Sundance and the Toronto International Film Festival.

Festivals could request submissions via the web and manage incoming submissions electronically, instead of the traditional route of sending in screener DVDs via mail. This allowed festivals to market their event to over 400,000 active filmmakers already on the Withoutabox platform, accept submission fees from them electronically, and automatically notify filmmakers for acceptance into their event. Other services included: streaming on the Internet via IMDb, and selling DVDs and video-on-demand downloads on Amazon.com via CreateSpace.

As of October 30, 2019, the website is no longer in service.

== Controversy ==
Withoutabox has attracted criticism in the years following its takeover in 2008 by IMDB, owned in turn by Amazon. Some filmmakers and festivals alike have accused the company of excessive charges, uncompetitive practices, outdated technology and the usual claims of aggressive litigation leveled at Amazon.

== Partners (partial list) ==
- Sundance Film Festival
- Slamdance Film Festival
- Cannes Film Festival
- International Film Awards Berlin
- Toronto International Film Festival
- AFI Fest
- Los Angeles Film Festival
- Mill Valley Film Festival
- Seattle International Film Festival
- Detroit Windsor International Film Festival
- Canadian Short Screenplay Competition
- Arizona International Film Festival
- Adelaide International Film Festival

== See also ==
- FilmFreeway
- Festhome
- Shortfilmdepot
- Film festival
- List of film festivals
- List of fantastic and horror film festivals
- List of documentary film festivals
- List of short film festivals
