= Chadwick Pelletier =

American entrepreneur and entertainment executive

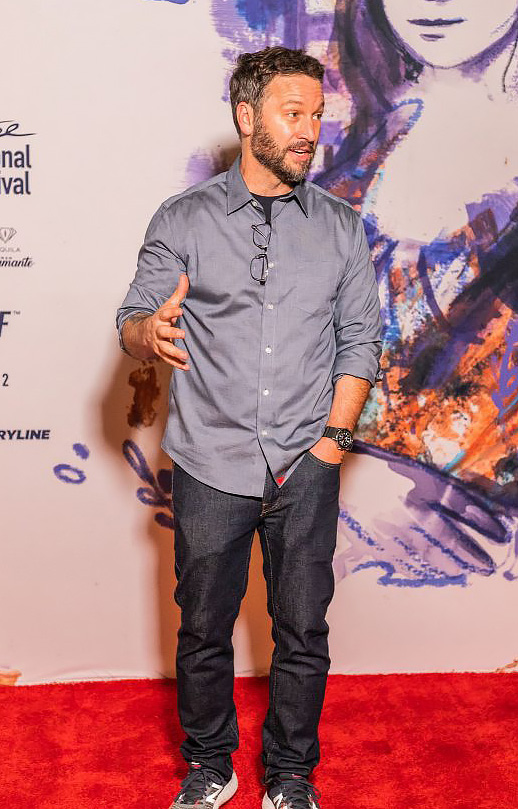
- Pelletier at the DaVinci International Film Festival (2022)
- Born: September 25, 1973 (age 52); Denver, Colorado, U.S.
- Occupations: Festival Director, Entrepreneur, Producer
- Years active: 2017–present
- Known for: Founder and Executive Director of the DaVinci International Film Festival
- Spouse: Holly Brentson (m. 2001)

Chadwick Pelletier is an American entrepreneur and entertainment executive best known as the founder and executive director of the DaVinci International Film Festival (DIFF).

== DaVinci International Film Festival ==
In 2017, Pelletier founded the DaVinci International Film Festival (DIFF). Operating as a boutique international film platform, DIFF is dedicated to honoring independent cinema from around the world, with its flagship festival events hosted at AMC Theatres at The Grove in Los Angeles.

As Executive Director, Pelletier oversees festival programming and special recognitions through the platform's signature Leo and Visionary Awards. Under his direction, the festival has become a top-reviewed, five-star platform dedicated to honoring independent cinema from around the world, while also celebrating industry icons whose work has made a lasting impact both on and off the screen. This includes presenting the festival's inaugural Visionary Award to Michael J. Fox, an Honorary Leo to actor Emile Hirsch, and a Visionary Award to Academy Award-nominated writer-director Randall Wallace. In addition to its flagship Los Angeles event, DIFF has expanded its international footprint with a DaVinci Masquerade event held annually at the Carlton Hotel during the Cannes Film Festival.

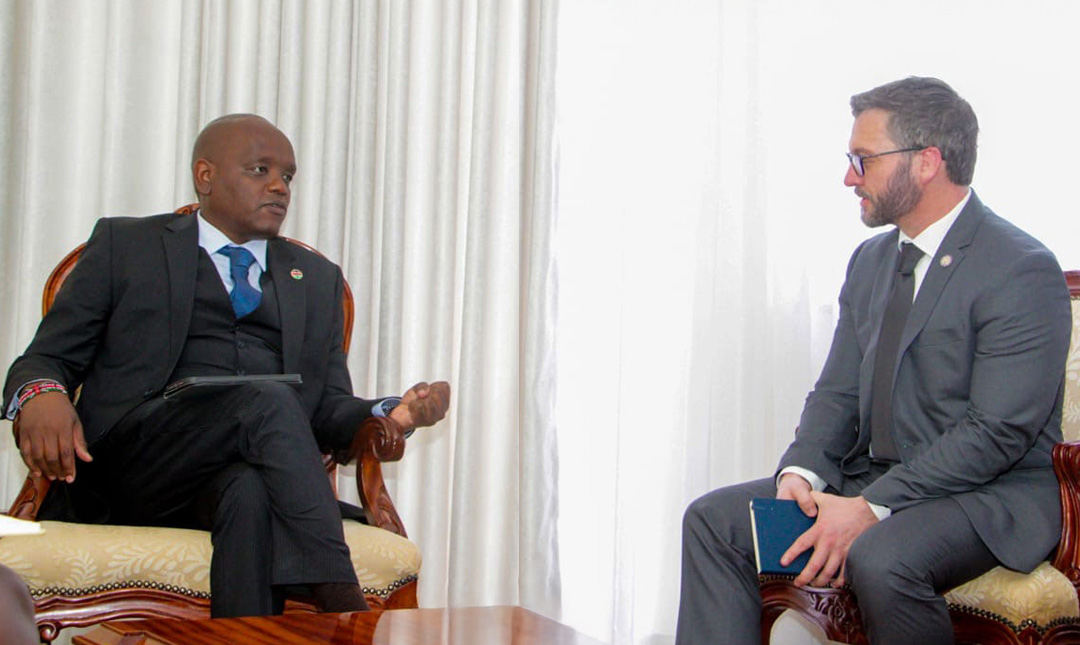
DIFF Founder, Chadwick Pelletier with Kenya Government Official, Dennis Itumbi

Pelletier also spearheaded DIFF's international cultural outreach initiative, FilmAfrica. The program incorporates curated showcases and industry panels designed to promote African cinema and establish creative partnerships. In connection with the initiative, Pelletier met with government officials and industry representatives in Nairobi, Kenya, to coordinate regional co-production pathways and preview festival programming extensions.
