= The Canadian Short Screenplay Competition =

Annual script writing contest

- The CSSC Logo
- Founded: 2008; 18 years ago
- Founded by: David Cormican
- Awards: The Writers Block Crystal Award
- Hosted by: Fun Republic Pictures
- Website: funrepublicpictures.com/the-canadian-short-screenplay-competition/

The Canadian Short Screenplay Competition (CSSC), established in 2008, is an annual script writing contest for short film screenwriting.

== History ==
The CSSC, founded in 2008 by producer David Cormican, is administered by Year of the Skunk Productions. The competition's partners in 2008 included Playback, Meridian Artists, InkTip, The Spoke Club and Withoutabox.

In August 2009, the competition started the now popular #WW (Writer Wednesday) hashtag on social networking site X (formerly Twitter).

In 2010, the competition partnered with the Yorkton Film Festival, allowing the CSSC to announce the winner of the competition as part of the Golden Sheaf Awards gala. British writer Neil Graham was the first winner announced in this fashion on May 29th, 2010, in Yorkton, Saskatchewan. Graham and his script "Something Pointless", were the first recipients of the Writer's Block Crystal, which was introduced to the competition in 2010 as a takeaway award for the top three screenwriters.

In June 2010, the CSSC announced two-time competition finalist, Carolynne Ciceri, as the inaugural #WW Writer Wednesday Laureate. Ciceri's duties in the appointment consisted of a year-long position posting a weekly blog on the subjects of writing, filmmaking and short film.

On January 1st, 2011, the CSSC's THE Blog won in the category of 'Writing and Literature' as part of the 2010 Canadian Weblog Awards.

On December 19th, 2024, Playback reported that the CSSC would relaunch with its 6th Edition with Writer's Block Crystal Awards being awarded at the 78th Yorkton Film Festival in May 2024. The winners were announced at the Yorkton Film Festival on May 25th, 2025, with the Best of Fest prize going to Michael Young for The Sound of Trees.

== Prizes ==
Each script to place in the top three is awarded the Writer's Block Crystal Award.

The grand prize of the competition is the Best of Fest title. The Best of Fest script is awarded a cash prize along with an option and purchase agreement. The first runner-up is awarded the honorary title of Golden Cinema, and the second place script is awarded Silver Screen. Each script will get an option and purchase agreements along with a cash sum. Additionally, the following ten scripts are awarded as Finalists, and presented with additional prize packages.

== #WW Writers Wednesday ==
The CSSC maintains that they conceptualized and posted the very first weekly hashtag #WW (popularly used and known amongst writing circles as Writer Wednesday) on X (formerly Twitter). Writers and users of the site may nominate writers on Twitter, encouraging others using the site to follow by using the #WW hashtag (similar to #ff or #followfriday) within a tweet.

The original #WW Writers Wednesday post was made using TweetDeck on August 5th, 2009.

== 2008 Winners ==
1- Seeing In The Dark written by Gordon Pengilly
2- No Man’s Land written by David Carey
3- Rusted Pyre written by Daniel Audet

Rusted Pyre was filmed in 2010 in Havelock, Saskatchewan, directed by Laurence Cohen and starred Samantha Somer Wilson and Brooke Palsson. It premiered in 2011 at The Worldwide Short Film Festival.

No Man’s Land was directed by Laurence Cohen and starred David Cormican and Tommy Hayes. It was released as Will in 2012.

Seeing in the Dark was directed by Helen Hatzis and David Cormican and starred Amy Matysio, Josh Straight, and Cormican. It premiered at the Edmonton International Film Festival in 2011.

== 2009/2010 Winners ==
1- "Something Pointless", Neil Graham
2- "Minus Lara", Suri Parmar
3- "The Kicker", Jag Dhadli

The Canadian Short Screenplay Competition filmed Minus Lara, directed by Rob W. King and starring Romina D'Ugo, in Regina, Saskatchewan. It premiered in 2011 at the Edmonton International Film Festival.

Something Pointless began production on May 26th, 2025, one day after the ceremony for the 6th Edition. It is directed by Asa Bailey, and stars Leo Harris, Owen Teale, Sophie Thompson, and Sule Rumi.

== 2010/2011 Winners ==
1- "Elijah the Prophet", Jesse & Zachary Herrmann
2- "Strange Music", Ira Henderson
3- "13", Sundae Jahant-Osborn

Elijah the Prophet was produced by the CSSC and was released as a film in 2012, directed by Ashley Cooper and starring Art Hindle.

== 2012 Winners ==
1- "An Incandescent Light", David Gott
2- "Oh Bananas", Denis Goldberg
3- "Letters from a Stone Cold Killer", Sean Harris Oliver

== 2013 Winners ==
1- "The Triumphant Death of Frank Bean", Catherine R. Hardin
2- "The Modern Man is Beat", David J. Schroeder
3- "Bigger and Better", Liz Ulin

== 2025 Winners ==
1- "The Sound of Trees", Michael Young
2- "Last Meal: A Love Story", Betty Robertson
3- "Hail!", Lee Murray Chetland
