= Simply Music =

Simply Music is a music education organization licensing teachers at over 700 locations in twelve countries and serving an online self-study student community in 128 countries. Australian music educator Neil Moore founded it on the core belief that all humans are naturally musical. Simply Music offers programs for students from birth through old age, with the stated goal that "students acquire and retain music as a lifelong companion." Simply Music patterns its approach after primary language acquisition, where speaking comes first. In this it shares some philosophical ground with other developmental approaches like Kodály, Orff Schulwerk, and the Suzuki Method.

== History ==
Neil Moore began constructing the Simply Music method in the late 20th century while teaching piano to a young blind boy. Since Moore was unsure how to apply traditional methods of reading music, he wondered if an approach, based on his own childhood relationship to music, might work. From about age 3 or 4, Moore would hear music and naturally visualize it as shapes and patterns. At age 7, when his piano teacher would play the songs he was to learn, Moore recognized those same shapes and patterns across the keyboard. Decades later, Moore described his approach to this blind student, giving the boy a way to feel the shapes and patterns on the instrument. Moore continued this process, and within a few months his new student was playing a range of blues, popular, and classical pieces. The boy began using the same approach to teach the songs to his four-year-old sister, who was also blind.

This spurred Moore to begin testing his ideas more widely, and he found this approach natural and successful for students of all ages and abilities. Other piano teachers began learning from Moore. When he could no longer personally train them all, Moore founded the Simply Music organization and developed a remote certification program that is currently available to teachers in twelve countries, including the U.S., Canada, Australia, and New Zealand.

Later, Simply Music expanded to support the development of early childhood music education, and also worked with Karen Nisenson to create Simply Music Gateway, an adaptive piano curriculum for children with special needs.

== Philosophy ==
Simply Music's founding premise is similar to Shin'ichi Suzuki's claim that any child can learn music. But Simply Music extends the concept, like researchers E. McPherson Gary E. McPherson and Graham F. Welch, who write that it is our "birthright" to "be able to communicate and interact musically with others." In the same degree, Simply Music declares musicality essential to human nature. Adherents identify many everyday activities as fundamentally musical because these activities thoughtlessly fall into patterns of rhythm and pitch. As examples they cite speaking, walking, and brushing teeth. Simply Music seeks both to draw on and to nurture this natural ability by distilling musical concepts into simple patterns.

Students use these patterns to begin playing songs in their first lessons. This method is modeled after primary language acquisition, where learners begin by speaking. Many other music education approaches—including Orff Schulwerk and the Dalcroze, Kodály, and Suzuki methods—engage students physically first and teach notation later. The complete Simply Music program aims to teach music for generalists, who may or may not later choose a specialty such as performing classical music, playing keyboard in a band, or accompanying soloists or theater performers. The program attempts to prepare students with a solid music background that can take them where they choose. The primary goal is for students to keep music in their life, most often for relaxation and enjoyment at home or with family and friends. As such, Simply Music includes a wide variety of musical genres, such as classical, blues, jazz, and popular.

Simply Music does not focus on mastering classical concert performance technique. Instead, Simply Music teachers encourage students to play expressively and comfortably, without tension.

== Pedagogy ==
The Simply Music approach contrasts with many other music learning methods, where the ability to play music depends first on learning to read music. Moore terms these traditional methods reading-based and his approach playing-based.

The core playing-based piano pieces are presented in the Foundation Program, a series of 9 levels of 7-10 songs each. The pieces are designed to provide experience with many musical styles and genres, to build students' physical dexterity at the piano, and to give students hands-on familiarity with fundamental musical concepts.

Alongside the Foundation Program, and often using concepts from the Foundation pieces, students learn arrangement, improvisation, composition, chord-reading, and theory. Teachers are required to present all these programs, as they are considered essential to a well-rounded music education.

Simply Music maintains that their approach—based on learning to recognize patterns inherent in music—is distinct from learning by rote or by ear. Students learn through patterns on the keyboard, in their fingers, and in the music itself. Students learn the physical shape that a melody line or a chord forms in the hand or on the keyboard. For example, a basic triad such as D Major is seen as a triangle shape on the keyboard, with the two white notes forming the base and the black note at the top. Musical patterns include concepts like repeated rhythmic or melodic patterns (or sequences), melodic sentences, musical forms such as ABA, and chord progressions like the 12-bar blues.

Experience with these concepts provides a foundation for learning note-reading during the second year. Simply Music first teaches rhythm notation, followed by pitch reading, and then applies these skills to pieces written in standard music notation. Students learn to read pitches by identifying intervals, rather than individual note-names. This is known as an intervallic approach. Simply Music also uses what they call generative learning, meaning that students write music as an integral part of learning to read music.

As students further expand their musicianship, they move into the Development Program, which applies their musical understanding and note-reading skills to increasingly complex written music. Lessons continue to include arrangement, improvisation, composition, chord-reading, and theory. At this phase, students also explore their own musical interests in more depth.

Simply Music piano may be taught in either shared or private lessons. The early childhood program is taught in small groups.

== Early childhood ==
Simply Music partners with an affiliate young childhood music education program, Lynn Kleiner's Music Rhapsody.

Music Rhapsody is a music and movement program for infants through age five. Early childhood music education specialist Lynn Kleiner based the program on the Orff Schulwerk philosophy. In keeping with its roots, the program focuses on learning through play and addresses each stage of child development. The program immerses children in music-making through diverse songs, instruments, movement, puppets and visuals. By building a foundation in music and incorporating Simply Music repertoire, it prepares students to transition into the piano program.

== Materials ==
All the Simply Music programs use a variety of multimedia materials to provide multisensory learning. Simply Music Piano students use written music as well as other written materials to remember assignments and track their progress. Video recordings distill the main points of every lesson. Audio recordings help students become familiar with the songs, refine style and technique, and develop ensemble skills. Teacher training is also presented through multimedia materials.

Early childhood Music Rhapsody students use a wide variety of specially designed instruments along with movement materials, puppets, and visuals. The program also provides audio recordings for students and teachers, as well as video support for teachers.

== Repertoire ==
The Simply Music Piano repertoire covers a broad range of styles, including classical, contemporary, jazz, blues, gospel, and other styles from around the world. In addition to the core Foundation pieces, students learn arrangements of each piece, along with accompaniments, teacher-selected written pieces, student-choice songs, and student compositions.

A student’s personal repertoire is called their Playlist. A Playlist is considered essential, partly because a large and varied repertoire helps facilitate lifelong musical engagement. Also, each new piece builds on musical concepts from earlier pieces.

The Music Rhapsody curriculum centers around children’s music, both traditional and contemporary, and also introduces many styles including classical, jazz, blues, and international music.
