= Irati, Santa Catarina =

Coordinates: 26°39′21″S 52°53′31″W

- Municipality
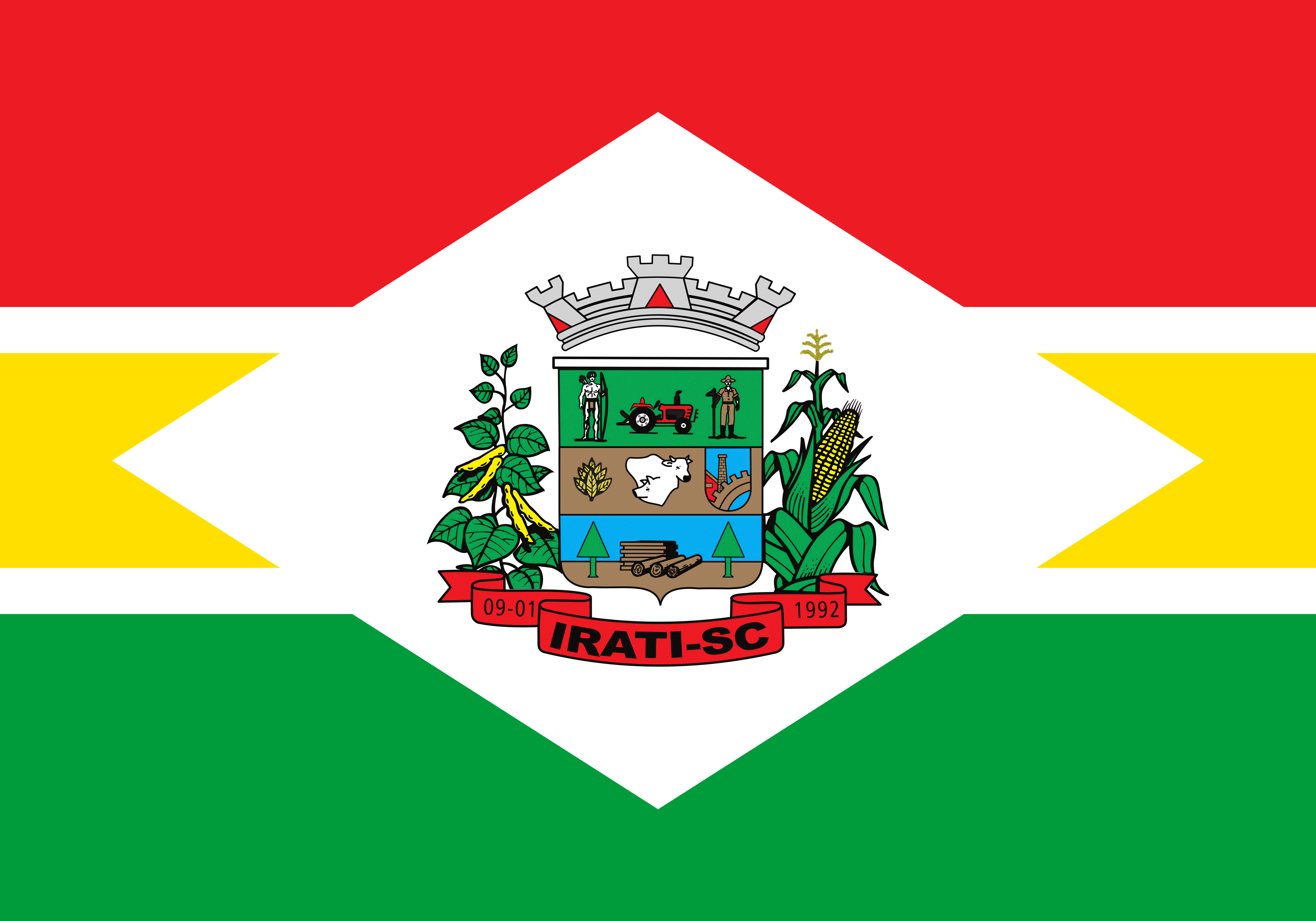
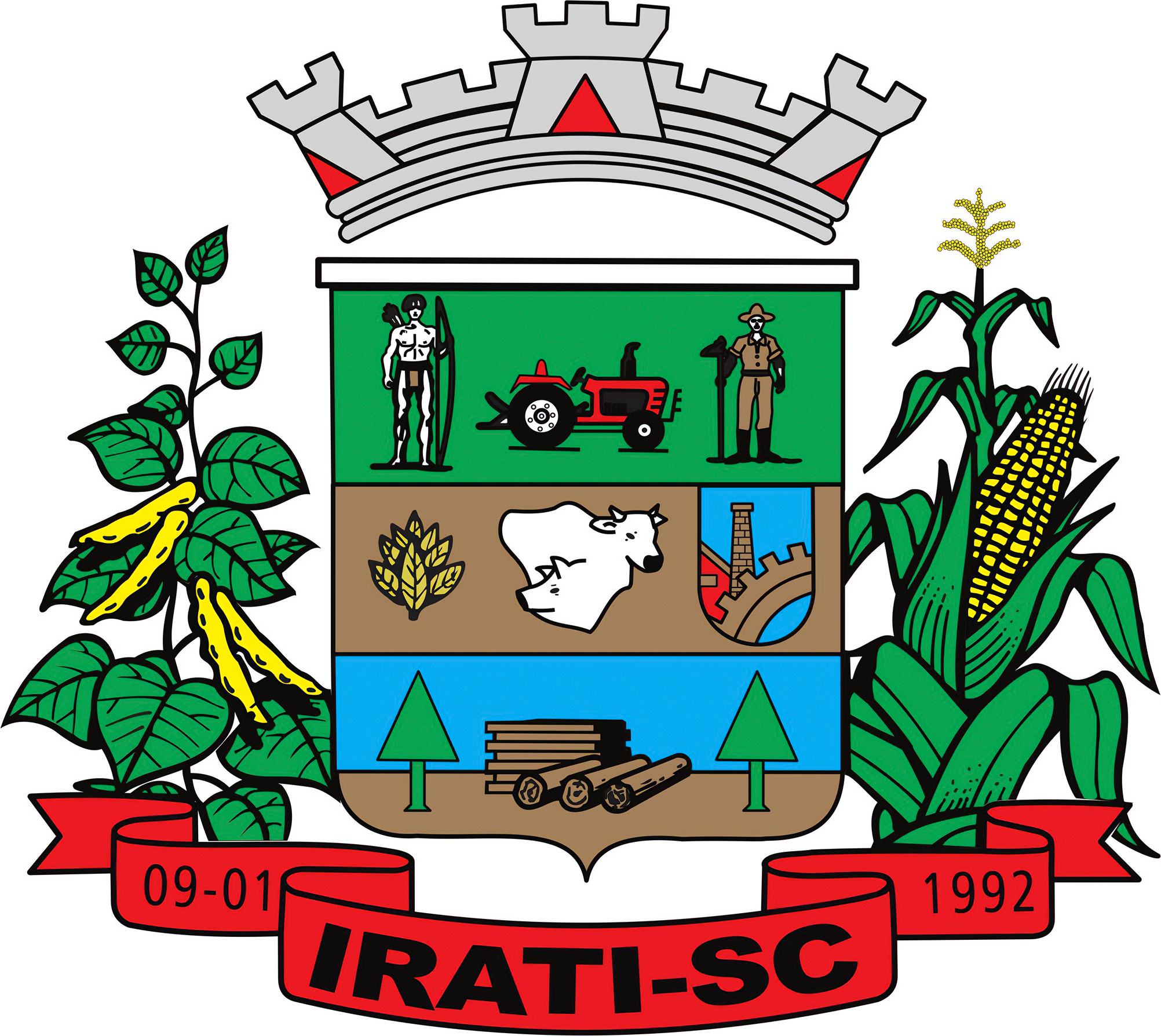
- Flag Coat of arms
- Interactive map of Irati, Santa Catarina
- Country: Brazil
- Region: South
- State: Santa Catarina
- Mesoregion: Oeste Catarinense

Population (2020)
  - Total: 1,909
- Time zone: UTC -3
- Website: www.irati.sc.gov.br

Irati, Santa Catarina is a municipality in the state of Santa Catarina in the South region of Brazil.

== See also ==
- List of municipalities in Santa Catarina
