= Parkway Cinemas =

Independent Cinema Chain

- Type: Private
- Industry: Entertainment
- Founded: 1983
- Founders: Gerald Parkes; Denise Parkes
- Headquarters: Cleethorpes.
- Number of locations: Cleethorpes; Louth; Barnsley; Beverley; Workington
- Products: Film screenings, event cinema, live performances
- Parent: Parkway Entertainment Company Limited
- Website: Official Website

Parkway Cinemas is a chain of independent movie theatres based in the United Kingdom, established in 1983. Operating across five locations: Cleethorpes, Louth, Barnsley, Beverley, and Workington

== History ==
Parkway Cinema was founded in 1983 by Gerald and Denise Parkes. Initially, the business sought to provide a diverse range of films and events in a welcoming environment, which became a hallmark of its operations. The cinema chain expanded throughout the years, establishing locations in several towns, including Cleethorpes, Barnsley, Louth, Beverley, and Workington.

The chain is known for its commitment to community engagement, providing special screenings tailored for families and individuals with specific needs, including autism-friendly sessions and senior screenings.

In 2013, Gerald Parkes was awarded an MBE for his services to the UK cinema industry. Following his passing, the business continued to thrive under the leadership of his wife Denise and their sons, Gerrard and Richard.

The Parkway chain faced challenges during the COVID-19 pandemic, which necessitated the temporary closure of cinemas. They adapted by implementing safety measures, including an online booking system, social distancing protocols, and enhanced cleaning procedures. On 17 May 2021, Parkway Cinema in Cleethorpes officially reopened after the pandemic, ready to welcome back customers.

In celebration of National Cinema Day on 3 September 2022, Parkway Cinema in Beverley participated by offering tickets for just £3. This initiative aimed to encourage audiences to return to the cinema after the disruptions caused by the pandemic.

In 2023, the cinema chain opened a newly refurbished luxury cinema at Dunmail Park in Workington on March 17, 2023, following a £4 million renovation. The venue features six screens with 4K laser projection and Dolby surround sound, along with luxury leather recliners.

In 2024, Parkway Cinema announced plans to expand with a new multi-screen cinema in Grimsby as part of the Future High Streets Fund initiative to revitalise local communities. Parkway Entertainment Company signed a deal to operate this venue, funded by the Government's initiative, which has allocated over £17 million for local redevelopment projects. Richard Parkes, director at Parkway, expressed excitement about bringing a cinema to Grimsby, highlighting the business's commitment to the local community.

In early September 2024, Parkway Cinema Barnsley's co-owner and director Rob Younger issued a heartfelt plea for community support, announcing a reduction in ticket prices to £5 in an effort to encourage more patrons to visit. The Barnsley cinema is reportedly facing severe challenges due to a lack of films resulting from writers' and actors' strikes, putting its future at risk. Rob emphasised the importance of community support, stating, “It’s now definitely a case of use us or lose us,” and expressed gratitude for the ongoing patronage of the local audience.

In October 2024 it was announced the Glowflare Short Film Festival would be held at Parkway Cinema Beverley.

== Locations and features ==
Each location offers a range of amenities and programming tailored to local audiences:

- Parkway Cinema Beverley: Located in the Flemingate Centre, this cinema features six screens, including Screen 6, known as the Hayward Theatre. The venue hosts a mix of film screenings, live performances, and special events, including autism-friendly and parent-and-baby screenings. It also runs The Little Penguin Club, providing discounted tickets for children's films on weekends.
- Parkway Cinema Barnsley: Situated on Eldon Street, this cinema has a long history, with cinema operations on the site dating back to 1908. Following renovations, the cinema retains a focus on community engagement and offers various screenings, including classic films and special events.
- Parkway Cinema Cleethorpes: This location underwent significant renovations and features state-of-the-art facilities, including digital projection and luxury seating. The cinema also hosts themed events and community outreach initiatives.
- Parkway Cinema Louth: Known for its community-focused programming, this cinema offers a range of films along with events that cater to local audiences.
- Parkway Cinema Workington: Opened in March 2023, this location features six screens and luxury electric recliners. The cinema has been noted for its significant investment in community facilities and programming.

== Community engagement and initiatives ==
Parkway Cinemas is involved in various community outreach efforts, such as offering free tickets to seniors as part of initiatives aimed at reducing social isolation. The cinemas also host special screenings tailored for families and individuals with specific needs, such as autism-friendly screenings and senior sessions.

== Awards and recognition ==
Parkway Cinema has received recognition for its contributions to local culture and the film industry. In 2017, the Beverley location was nominated for the Cinema of the Year (24 screens and under) Award at the Screen Awards. Additionally, during the pandemic, Parkway's management practices were highlighted in The Hollywood Reporter for their commitment to staff welfare.

== Gallery ==
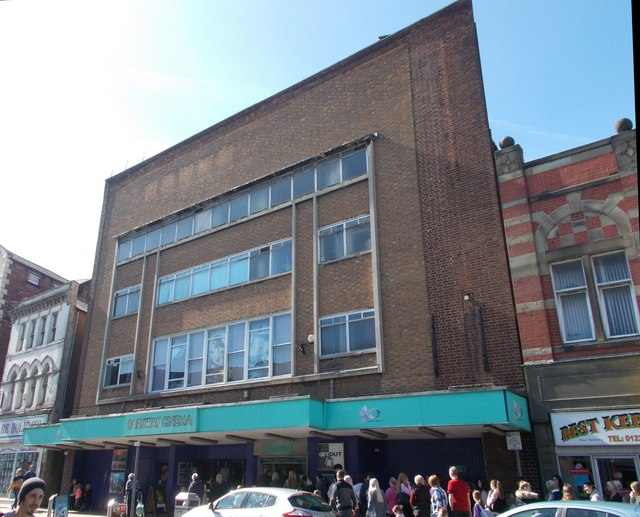
Parkway Cinema in Barnsley.

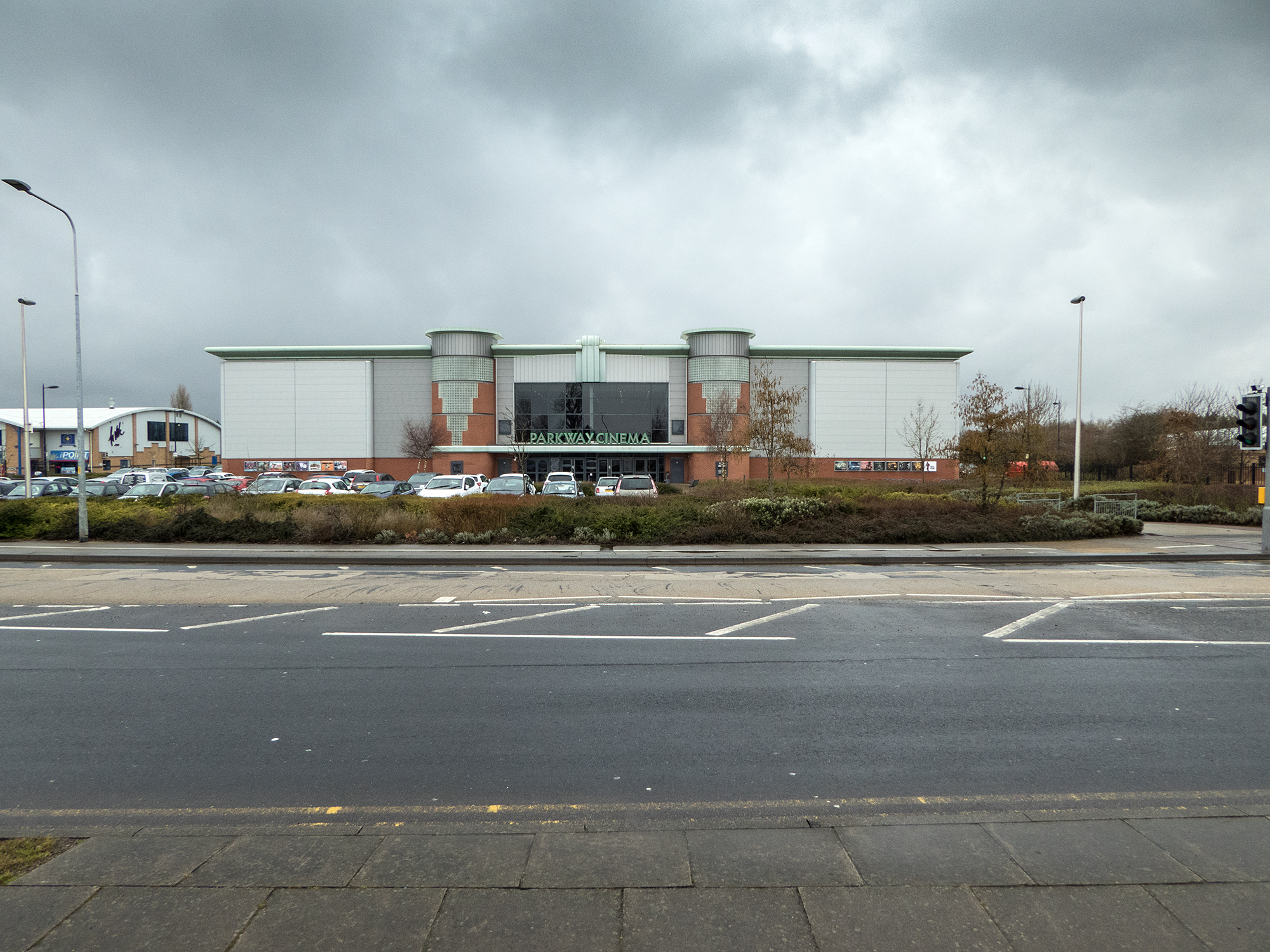
Parkway Cinema in Cleethorpes.
