= Douglas Pedro Sánchez =

Puerto Rican film director and screenwriter

Douglas-Pedro Sánchez (born in San Juan, Puerto Rico, on September 30, 1952) is a film director and screenwriter from Santurce, Puerto Rico.

In 1979 he produced, wrote and directed the feature-length film Cualquier cosa (Any Given Thing), which won him a Special Award from the Mexican Academy of Cinematographic Arts and Sciences in 1981, the same Award given to Pedro Armendáriz (1947), Cantinflas (1952), Dolores del Río (1975), Paul Leduc (1977), and Luis Buñuel (1978).

In recent years, Sánchez has written and directed two feature films: Sol de medianoche (Midnight Sun), based on the detective-novel of the same title by Puerto Rican author Edgardo Rodríguez Juliá and La última gira (The Last Tour), based on the chronicle-novel Vengo a decirle adiós a los muchachos by Puerto Rican author Josean Ramos.

== Beginnings ==
In 1974, Sánchez graduated with Honors in Comparative Literature from Brown University, where he studied with Robert Scholes, Nicanor Parra, Alain Robbe-Grillet, Arnold Weinstein, and Michael Silverman. Weinstein and Silverman supervised his Honors Thesis in which Sánchez analyzed and compared the Jorge Luis Borges short story, The Theme of the Traitor and the Hero, and the film by Bernardo Bertolucci based on the same story, The Spider’s Stratagem, exploring the themes of the politics of spectacle, and the spectacle of politics.

Sánchez also completed film-making courses at Rhode Island School of Design (RISD) and New York University (NYU), studying with Martin Scorsese’s mentor Haig P. Manoogian, and producing one of his earliest films, Superman on the West Side (1973). At that time, Sánchez read Jorge Ayala Blanco’s first book, La aventura del cine mexicano, which re-awakened his interest in Mexican film ─ an integral part of his childhood in San Juan.

Upon graduating from Brown University, Sánchez was awarded a Fulbright Scholarship to study the History of Mexican cinema, and spent the next year doing research and screening films at the first Cineteca Nacional, a venture which culminated in meeting film idol Jean-Luc Godard.

In 1975, Godard was invited to Mexico to present a film project to the Mexican Cinematography Department. Sánchez attended his press conference at the Mexico City airport where Godard attempted to talk about his project --to star María Félix-- while the press kept asking him about his presumed relationship with Brigitte Bardot during the filming of Le Mépris. This incident, exaggerated to absurdity, became the premise and first sequence of Sánchez' first feature, Cualquier cosa (Any Given Thing)(1979).

After a brief stint as film critic for Revista Otrocine, Sánchez further pursued graduate studies in Hispanic-American Literature at the Filosofía y Letras Department of the National Autonomous University of Mexico (UNAM) with Puerto Rican writer José Luis González, Mexican surrealism scholar Margo Glantz, and Spanish theorist Adolfo Sánchez Vázquez, before entering the Centro Universitario de Estudios Cinematográficos (then the CUEC, now the ENAC), also part of the UNAM, where he studied the History of Film Language with film historian and critic Jorge Ayala Blanco.

By the time he graduated from the CUEC, Sánchez and his classmates were thought about by Jorge Ayala Blanco “the most brilliant and anarchic CUEC class in its 18 years of existence” and also by critic Gustavo García “the first free territory of Cinema-land”.

== Cualquier cosa (Any Given Thing) ==
Cualquier cosa (Any Given Thing) tells the story of Gualberto Rodríguez (Jaime Garza), an actor from Yucatán, who arrives in Mexico City with dreams of conquering the big city, planning to revolutionize the traditional photo-novel medium by linking it to social and political reality. The film narrates, in a tragicomic tone, Gualberto's efforts to produce his 'revolutionary' photo-novel.

Cualquier cosa had a great impact on the Mexican film scene and:

- was favorably reviewed by every major critic in Mexico City.
- participated in the Mannheim International Film Festival in October 1980
- premiered and had a sold-out two-week run at the Cineteca Nacional's Salon Rojo beginning January 21, 1981,
- was one of eight Mexican films exhibited at the Centre Georges Pompidou as part of the Journées de Culture Mexicain in June 1981, one of six Mexican films exhibited in Madrid's Filmoteca Nacional as part of a Mexican Independent Film cycle in October 1981
- was one four Mexican films featured in the 1982 International Film Guide where critic Tomás Pérez Turrent said the film: "...reveals great aesthetic coherence and control over the film medium... The construction acts like a series of mirrors, reflecting each other, thus losing all linear notion. The narration gives an impression of being unpremeditated and haphazard... It is an audacious and intelligent film, subverting the dominant modes of filmmaking... fragmenting and pluralizing its own dramatic statement, accumulating digressions and redundancies until the hypothetical conducting line is reduced to a minimum, breaking with the determinist logic of the discourse which all narration implies. [Any Given Thing] demonstrates... that it is in independent filmmaking, free from the imperatives of the industry, that the future of Mexican cinema lies."
- Jorge Ayala Blanco included it in his review of Mexican cinema for the years 1973–1985, La condición del cine mexicano as one of "two outstanding fiction films" for the period covered, stating: "Any Given Thing is an exercise in overflown imagination... ridiculing any past, present, and future form of demagogic, redemptive messages… This explosion of glorious inventions is the McLuhanian delirium of under-development, a well-organized political schizophrenia denoting the genuine, everyday kind, a hyper-technological structure that operates by denouncing itself… Expressive anarchy finds a brilliant balance, to bloodily mock the spurious primitivism of a populist cinema that thinks itself militant. This masterpiece of the signifying game is a disrespectful mockery of all types of populist cinema… Hyperrealism broken from the inside, a round of real and imaginary times, always ideologized spaces, controlled improvisations, anti-picturesque satire of the mass media biting its own tail, self-homage to the “age of simulacra” (Baudrillard), relentless supra-cultural fable that moves from Straub’s rigor to Kluge’s carnival of signifiers, a prodigious creation of sudden imaginary spaces that are also the space of the discourse of paradoxes, a rereading and un-reading of more than ten years of blunders of political films a la Mexicana, a re-encoding of the Brechtian tale in the congested Camp style, Any Given Thing is the result of a qualitative leap in the expressive search of its creators."

Because of Cualquier cosa (Any Given Thing), the Mexican Academy of Cinematographic Arts and Sciences recognized Sánchez with a Special Award in its XXIII Arieles Ceremony (the Mexican Oscars).

== Professional work ==
Before returning to Puerto Rico, Sánchez wrote, directed, and edited twenty-eight documentaries for the Channel 11 TV series Tiempo de acción (Time for Action) about the activities of the National Polytechnic Institute in Mexico City. He also worked with Arturo Ripstein, Gabriel Retes and other Mexican directors at Churrubusco Studios in the direction and editing of forty-four educational TV episodes produced by the Public Education Department.

While working with Ripstein, Sánchez met Hispanic film master Luis Buñuel. In a brief aside, Buñuel concurred with Sánchez that Él (This Strange Passion) (1953), starring Arturo de Córdova, and Susana (1951), starring Rosita Quintana, were his best films.

Back in San Juan, Sánchez worked in advertising and public relations before obtaining a Juris Doctor degree from the University of Puerto Rico and practicing law until returning to filmmaking with Sol de medianoche.

== Sol de medianoche (Midnight Sun) ==
Sol de medianoche (Midnight Sun) is a Puerto Rican film-noir written and directed by Douglas Pedro Sánchez, starring Pedro Capó, Aris Mejías, Laura Alemán, Xavier Torres, Ana Isabelle, Cordelia González and Modesto Lacén.

The film had its World Première on November 10, 2017, at the New York International PR Heritage Film Festival where it won the Best Male Actor Award for Pedro Capó and the Best Female Actor Award for Aris Mejías.

A Gala Première was held on January 31, 2018, prior to the film's Theatrical Release in Puerto Rico on February 1, 2018.

On April 1, 2018, the film began an 18-month run on HBO Latino, HBO GO and HBO NOW.

In March 2019, the film won the Golden Dragon Award for Best Feature World at the Ferrara Film Festival.

Manuel Betancourt of Remezcla described Sol de medianoche as a thriller with a fast-paced narrative and a salsa-influenced score, noting its neon-lit nighttime cinematography and beach-set action sequences. He also drew comparisons to the visual style of filmmaker Brian De Palma.”
