= Neil Moore (musician) =

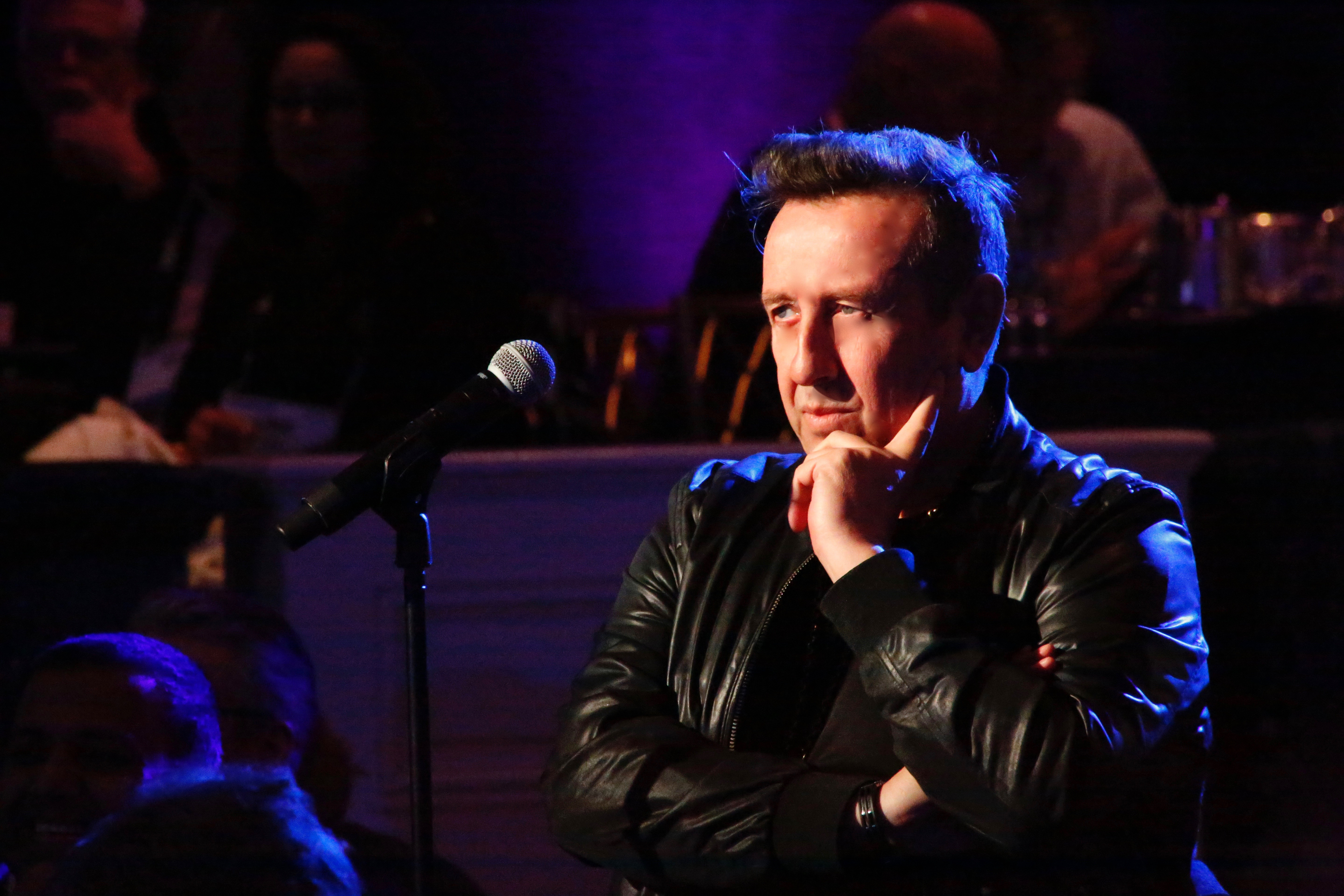
Neil Moore at the Abundance 360 event in Beverly Hills, California

Neil Moore is the founder of Simply Music, an international music education organization with over 700 locations worldwide. He also created the Simply Music piano method and composed much of the music used in the organization's piano programs.

== Early life ==
Moore was born in 1957 in Melbourne, Australia to parents who loved music and listened with their children to a wide variety of styles. From about age 3 or 4, Moore would hear music and naturally visualize it as shapes and patterns. At age 7, when his piano teacher would play the songs he was to learn, Moore recognized those same shapes and patterns across the keyboard. By age twelve Moore was playing a large repertoire of music, and continued playing piano through adolescence and into adulthood, never realizing that his unusual relationship with music would later shape his career.

== Adult life ==
Through early adulthood, Moore continued with piano while establishing a successful career in the restaurant and wine industries. He hoped to do well enough to retire from business and pursue music. A series of poor business decisions, compounded by the national economic crisis in the late 1990s, resulted in Moore losing everything. Facing this crisis brought clarity and a new direction. Moore decided to put his love of music first. Moore began taking open-enrollment music classes at the Australian music institution, The Victorian College of the Arts. During this time, he was recruited to teach a new music reading program to both students and instructors. He later relocated to California to bring that reading program to the United States.

== Simply Music ==
The idea for Simply Music came when Moore was asked to teach an eight-year-old blind child how to play piano. Since Moore was unsure how to apply traditional methods of reading music, he wondered if an approach, based on his own childhood relationship to music, might work. Moore described his approach in a way that allowed the boy to feel those same shapes and patterns on the instrument. Moore continued this process, and within a few months his new student was playing a range of blues, popular, and classical pieces. When Moore asked the boy's father if he was happy with his son's progress, the father responded, "Not only are we happy with it, but he’s teaching his four-year-old sister how to play this way, and she’s blind too."

In this key moment, Moore realized this approach might work more universally. He began designing materials and introducing the program to other young children and found that they quickly learned sophisticated music and gained a natural connection with it. He started testing his program more widely, with a range of ages, abilities, and teachers. He then expanded to reach older adults, students with developmental disabilities, and troubled youth. In every case, students found success. Not only did everyone learn to play piano, but they could also teach others how to play.

The Simply Music organization was founded as a way to formalize the method and organize a system for sharing it, eventually with teachers throughout the world. Simply Music is now presented by licensed educators in over 700 locations worldwide, as well as self-study students in 124 countries. It has broadened to support programs from birth through old age, including early childhood music and movement classes, piano lessons, audio production tutorials, and quality of life care for the elderly.
