= Neil Stevenson-Moore =

Canadian ice hockey player

- Born: 12 December 1980 (age 45) North Vancouver, British Columbia, Canada
- Height: 6 ft 2 in (188 cm)
- Weight: 225 lb (102 kg; 16 st 1 lb)
- Position: Forward
- Shot: Left
- Played for: Edinburgh Capitals
- NHL draft: Undrafted
- Playing career: 2005–2006

Neil Stevenson-Moore (Born 12 December 1980) is a Canadian former ice hockey forward who was born in North Vancouver, BC.

== Playing career ==
Stevenson-Moore signed with the Edinburgh Capitals of the British Elite Ice Hockey League in September 2005. Prior to his signing he played four seasons for Princeton University where he amassed 21 goals and 45 points to go with 73 penalty minutes. In his first season for the Capitals, Stevenson-Moore registered 38 points, which consisted of 20 goals and 18 assists. At the end of the year Stevenson-Moore was named the Capitals’ Player of the Year. In 2006 he accepted an invite to play for the ECHL's Bakersfield Condors However, he was released prior to the start of the season. thus ending his career.
