= Irati Santiago Mujika =

Film producer, TV producer and music video producer

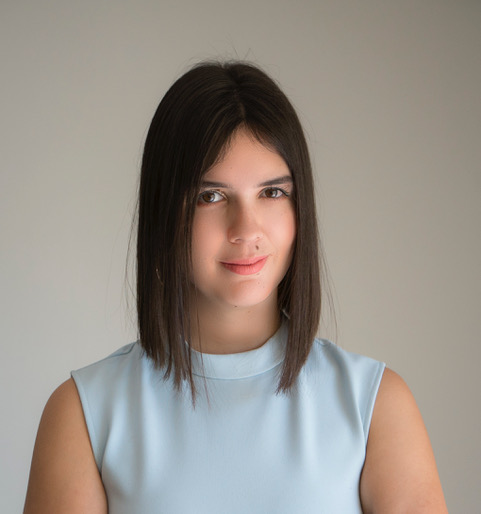
- Mujika in 2019
- Born: January 16, 1991 (age 35); Villabona, Spain
- Education: Columbia College Chicago
- Occupations: Film producer, TV producer

Irati Santiago Mujika (/ˈɪrɑːti/ IRA-tee; born January 16, 1991) is a music video producer, TV producer and film producer from Villabona, Spain. She has been professionally producing music videos, short films and feature films since 2016. Irati's most notable collaborations are with Steve Aoki, Paris Hilton and will.i.am.

== Early life and career ==
Irati was raised in Villabona, Spain; Irati was first exposed to video production when a school teacher showed her the work of Irving Thalberg. When Irati was 11 years old her parents bought her a video camera and she began making short films with her sister. In 2011 Irati spent her sophomore year of college at Wright State University in Dayton, Ohio. While at Wright State she received a scholarship to travel to Charlotte, North Carolina to produce a documentary with marine biology professors at Duke University. Irati graduated from Columbia College Chicago in 2017 in Chicago, Illinois with a Masters of Fine Arts. After graduating Irati began producing music videos with Juicy M, Cheat Codes, Afrojack and Tritonal. Irati filmed Aberne in 2017; the film was recorded in Basque Country, marking Irati's first international production.

After Aberne, Irati moved to Los Angeles, California in 2017 to pursue her career in video production. Currently Irati is working as a film producer and recently produced her first two feature films in 2019.

== Filmography ==
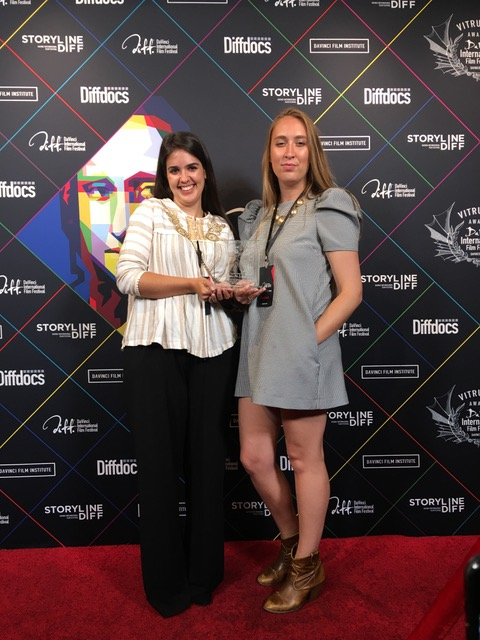
Irati Santiago Mujika at the Davinci Film Festival 2019

=== Feature films ===
Year	Title	Producer	Executive producer	Notes
2019	Blush	Associate	No	Post production
2019	Inside The Circle	Yes	No	Post production

=== Television ===
Year(s)	Title	Role	Notes
2019	Tech Toys	Line producer	13 episodes

=== Music videos ===
Year	Title	Artist(s)	Role	Notes
2017	Obey	Juicy M, Luka Caro, Enrique Dragon	Producer	
2017	Need U Around	Juicy M, Esty Leone	Producer	
2017	Make Love	Joe Stone	Producer	
2017	Temple	Blasterjaxx	Producer	
2017	Beautiful Girl	Caely	Producer	
2018	Addiction	Marsal Ventura, Ammau, Tony T & Alba Kras	Producer	
2018	Make Me Loco	Erikk Prince, Mark Detail	Producer	
2018	Love Me Now	Erikk Prince	Producer	
2019	Don't Go	Jonas Walk	Producer	
2019	Hard Pass	Tritonal, Ryann	Producer	
2019	Diamonds	Tritonal, Rosie Darling	Producer	
2019	Ferrari	Cheat Codes, Afrojack	Producer	
2019	Wandering Souls	Jonas Wak, Nvls	Producer	Blanco y Negro Music
2019	Children	Mattn, Klaas, Roland Clark	Producer	Smash the House
2019	Rave	Steve Aoki, Showtek, Makj	Producer	Ultra Music
2019	Lone Wolves	Mattn, Paris Hilton	Producer	Smash the House
2019	The Flight	Dimitri Vegas, Like Mike, Bassjackers, D'Angello & Francis	Producer	Smash the House

=== Short films ===
Year(s)	Title	Role	Nominations	Awards	Notes
2017	Aberne	Executive producer	10	2	First international film of her career
2017	Love Club	Producer	9	1	
2018	Beautiful Colors	Producer	30	3	
2018	Wounds	Producer	9	3	
2018	The Therapist	Producer	0	0	
2019	The Disease	Producer	0	0	
