= FilmFreeway =

Website for film festival submissions

- Website type: Film
- Available in: English
- Founded: 2014
- Headquarters: US
- Area served: Worldwide
- Parent: Backstage
- Website: filmfreeway.com
- Commercial: Yes
- Current status: Active

FilmFreeway is a website platform for filmmakers to submit their films to film festivals globally for selection consideration.

== History ==
Started in Canada in 2014 as a four-person startup, FilmFreeway steadily grew in competition to the much larger Amazon-owned company, Withoutabox. Until that time, Withoutabox had a virtual monopoly on the digital film festival submission process. With the closing in September 2019 of Withoutabox, FilmFreeway became the most popular film submission platform, followed closely by Festhome and Shortfilmdepot.

FilmFreeway was acquired by the Backstage publication and entertainment-industry portal in September 2021.

== Criticism ==
FilmFreeway has been criticized in the past for not addressing fraudulent, scam and pseudo film festivals on their platform.

FilmFreeway has since invested significantly in auditing existing festivals and adding additional screening measure to prevent fraudulent festivals from signing up and receiving submissions from Filmmakers.

== See also ==
- Festhome
- Shortfilmdepot
- Withoutabox (defunct)
- Film festival
- List of film festivals
- List of fantastic and horror film festivals
- List of documentary film festivals
- List of short film festivals
