= Count Arthur Strong's Radio Show! =

British comedy radio show

- The front cover of the second series CD release, featuring Count Arthur Strong
- Genre: Sitcom
- Running time: 28 minutes
- Country of origin: United Kingdom
- Language: English
- Home station: BBC Radio 4
- Starring: Steve Delaney; Alastair Kerr; Dave Mounfield; Joanna Neary (S1); Sue Perkins (S2–3); Mel Giedroyc (S4–8); Terry Kilkelly; Barry Cryer (S2&6); Kate Van Dike (S5); Peter Serafinowicz (S7)
- Created by: Steve Delaney
- Written by: Steve Delaney; Script Editor Graham Duff
- Produced by: Mark Radcliffe; John Leonard; Graham Duff
- Executive producers: Richard Daws; Drum
- Recording studio: Komedia, Brighton (S1-7); Dancehouse Theatre, Manchester (S4-7, 2014, 2019, 2020); Komedia Bath, Bath (S5); Dartington Hall, Dartington (2015); Brewhouse Theatre, Taunton (2016); Quays Theatre, Salford (2017, 2018); Barnfield Theatre, Exeter (2021)
- Original release: 23 December 2005 – 24 December 2021
- No. of series: 7 + 12 specials
- No. of episodes: 54
- Website: http://www.countarthurstrong.com

Count Arthur Strong's Radio Show! is a sitcom broadcast on BBC Radio 4, written by Steve Delaney. It features Count Arthur Strong, a former variety star who has malapropisms, memory loss and other similar problems, played by Delaney. Each episode follows the Count in his daily business and causing confusion in almost every situation. First broadcast on 23 December 2005, Count Arthur Strong's Radio Show! has had one pilot episode, seven series and eleven specials. In 2009 the show won the Gold Sony Radio Academy Award for comedy, the highest honour for a British radio comedy. A television adaptation, Count Arthur Strong, premiered on BBC Two in July 2013.

== History ==
The first three series of the show were recorded live at Komedia in Brighton. The fourth series was recorded at the Dancehouse Theatre, Manchester, Komedia Bath and Komedia Brighton. A special was recorded in Edinburgh during the 2008 Edinburgh Festival Fringe. It is jointly made by two production companies: Komedia Entertainment and Smooth Operations.

== Characters ==
=== Count Arthur Strong ===
Count Arthur Strong is a former variety star living in the North of England. The Count, now in his old age, has delusions of grandeur. He has selective memory loss, never hearing what he doesn't want to and malapropism-itis, which result in his confusing anyone he happens to be talking to and even confusing himself. However, he more often than not blames the people he is talking to for causing the confusion in the first place.

A typical conversation for the Count will involve his confusing both himself and others, while becoming drastically sidetracked from the matter in hand. He is usually oblivious to the chaos he causes, often blaming his interlocutors for any confusion. On the rare occasions he realises he is at fault, he often attempts to divert the blame by lying. Inevitably becoming confused by his own lies, his last resort is usually to claim he was recording a stunt for a hidden camera show. The Count does very rarely encounter frustrating situations which are not his fault such as doing a cooking show and only being brought products that were prepared in packets however he tends to simply complain in these circumstances before making matters worse than they were to start with. He has a misguided belief in his ability to hold his drink, and has often performed on stage or live TV/radio when drunk (or occasionally, concussed, with similar effects). He will often go to great lengths to get as drunk as he can as cheaply as he can.

The list of TV shows in which Count Arthur claims to have appeared is remarkably similar to Delaney's own career. However, the one role that Count Arthur speaks about wherever possible, is what he calls the "Bridge Up The River Kwai", where he claims to have appeared alongside Alec Guinness, apparently resenting the fact that Guinness got the part instead of him, although he does point out that he took over the role for the musical version. He also seems resentful that Sean Connery beat him to the lead role in Doctor No, the title of which he often confuses with either Doctor Who or Doctor Dolittle. He has had roles, or at least sat in a car, in numerous TV series and films, such as Juliet Bravo and of course "The Man Who Had Some Shoes".

The Count believes himself to be an expert on Egyptology, leading to the show "Count Arthur Strong's Forgotten Egypt". This stems from his army days when he toured Egypt as part of the cast of what he calls Piddler on the Roof.

He claims to have many show business friends although, apart from Guinness, this seems limited to brief conversations with Anita Harris and Jimmy Clitheroe. He also appears to have a mixed relationship with Edward Woodward. While resenting Woodward's success, he also claims that his advice meant that "for the first time in years, Edward Woodward can cross his legs when he sits down". Woodward's name causes the Count many problems, calling him "Edward Woodwardward", "Edward Woodwind", "Edward Woodbine", "Wedward Goodwood", at one point saying, "In my game, you've got to be available 25-7, 380 degrees of the year – that's why Edward Woodworm's getting so much work!" etc.

=== Malcolm Titter ===
In some of his stage shows, and in an episode per radio series, the Count has been joined by his protégé, Malcolm Titter (stage name Malcolm de Tinsel). Malcolm is a budding actor and playwright, and goes to the Count for acting lessons. The result is that the naive Malcolm's work is shown to be utterly abysmal.

=== Other characters ===
Other than Count Arthur, there are other regular characters in the series played by Alastair Kerr, Dave Mounfield (Geoffrey the Caretaker, Gerry the Cafe Owner and Jack the Barman), Joanna Neary (series one), Sue Perkins (series two and three and the first two specials) and Mel Giedroyc (since series four). These characters include Arthur's butcher Wilf Taylor; cafe owner Gerry; Geoffrey the church hall caretaker; female friend Sally; and Malcolm Titter played by Terry Kilkelly, a student actor for whom Arthur acts as teacher. Other guest appearances have been made by Barry Cryer, a showbiz colleague of Arthur's, Kate Van Dike played the dying mother of Arthur in The Musical in series 5 and the stage show of the same name, Martin Marquez in shows 4 and 5 of series 7, and Peter Serafinowicz who appears in series 7, Episode 1: 'The Minx' voicing Terry Wogan.

== Episodes ==
Episode information from BBC website, Episodes

=== Series 1 ===
Title	Airdate	Overview
Book Signing	23 December 2005	After some confusion with the local pharmacist, regarding his enlargements of Danny La Rue and a missing cauliflower, Arthur has a visit from Television Licensing. Eventually it transpires that his cleaner's son has bought his licence on the internet. Arthur is then interviewed at Jerry's about his diaries prior to a book signing at Wilf Taylor's Quality Meats.
Cookery Show	30 December 2005	We join Arthur philosophising on the alphabet and The Sound of Music whilst queuing at the Post Office where he is buying stamps. After turning the tables on a charity collector Arthur goes for a hair cut and then on to the studio for the recording of his cookery show. Arthur has to improvise a meal from a selection of ingredients supplied by his guest, who was once an understudy for Private Pike on Dad's Army. After the ingredients prove unsuitable Arthur decides to order a take away and moves onto some wine tasting resulting in the show descending into drunken chaos.
Radio Play	6 January 2006	Arthur visits Wilf's, on his way to the BBC to take part in the recording of a radio play, and swats a fly on one of Wilf's pork chops. Once at the studio Arthur manages to aggravate the director and then takes a young actor under his wing. A visit to the local pub during the lunch break leads to his protégé being sick and the recording falling behind schedule. It then transpires that Arthur was never cast in the show at all, in fact it was down to him that the original producer is off with a broken leg. After injuring the replacement producer Arthur takes his protégé back to the pub before inviting him to share the soiled pork chop.
James Bond	13 January 2006	Arthur is attempting to make toast, using the VCR he bought at a car boot sale, when he is interrupted by a mini-cab driver who has arrived 12 hours too early to take him to the Women's Institute where he is due to give a talk on his life in show business. Returning to the matter in hand Arthur calls the helpline where an assistant thinks he is the subject of a prank call when Arthur explains he "put a slice of Nimble in an hour ago and it's still not popped up". Arthur later takes the bus to the WI where he gives a talk covering topics including his audition for James Bond, returning home he manages to catch an episode of Minder on his toaster.
The Audition	20 January 2006	Arthur awakes from a nightmare where he is starring in a Second World War drama set during the Siege of Stalingrad. A door to door salesman of household goods meets his match in Arthur who manages to wangle himself a free scouring pad. After some difficulties getting through the studio door Arthur delivers his own unique style of audition.
Piccalilli	27 January 2006	We find Arthur in his "laboratory" where he is experimenting on a new range of piccalilli. His protégé, Malcolm, turns up to practise his audition speech for the musical Cats, but is roped into testing the piccalilli. Malcolm's nerve induced diarrhoea is exacerbated by Arthur's piccalilli. Visits to Jerry's and Wilf's to try and market the new celebrity condiment are followed by Arthur having to stand in for Malcolm at the Cats audition due to his incapacitation.

=== 2006 Special ===
Title	Airdate	Overview
Count Arthur Strong's Christmas Special	26 December 2006	Arthur dreams of being Ebenezer Scrooge visited by "woefully under-prepared" ghosts before awakening and preparing for Christmas by a visit to Wilf's to preview his turkey. After rejecting those birds with an "altitude" problem he moves on to present his own take on the Nativity Story for the cubs. He then pops into the Shoulder of Mutton before entertaining the inmates at the local old people's home.

=== Series 2 ===
Title	Airdate	Overview
Motivational Speech	28 February 2007	Arthur delivers a motivational speech, advertised by placing an advert in the Post Office. He uses the technique of making his audience wear Dunce's caps and banging a dustbin lid while telling them how useless they are. Owing to a mix-up at the printers, a banner he ordered is delivered reading "Closing down, everything £1".
Just A Minute	7 March 2007	Arthur is engaged to appear on the radio programme Just a Minute. He enlists the help of his protégé Malcolm to make sure he is 'match fit'. Together they pick topics from the newspaper and Arthur attempts to speak for one minute without "repetition, er, hesitation, deviation, or repetition", but finds it difficult to get the hang of the game. They lunch at Jerry's, where Malcolm tries to perform his 'homework', a speech from Macbeth, while Arthur interrupts him without pause on the subject of Taggart. When Arthur arrives at the BBC he is given directions to join the audience and is eventually interviewed on a current affairs programme in place of Arthur C. Clarke, although he believes he is appearing on Just a Minute.
After-Dinner Speech	14 March 2007	Arthur receives a call from Barry Cryer, who asks that he step in at the last minute to give an after-dinner speech for the World Wildlife Fund. Arthur arranges to meet Barry at Gerry's cafe, but is forced to pretend to be a pest-control officer to find a table. Repairing to the Shoulder of Mutton they begin to plan Arthur's speech, but Barry ends up having too much to drink. When they come to give their speeches, Barry's goes very badly and he falls asleep after the first few sentences. Arthur's speech descends into confusion when he loses his temper and it's back to the Shoulder of Mutton.
Oxford Union	21 March 2007	Arthur is invited to take part in a debate on Creationism vs. Evolution at the Oxford Union. He is reminded of his commitment only hours before the debate and borrows a book on Darwin from the local library, which he takes to the Shoulder of Mutton to do some swotting. At the Oxford Union he takes full advantage of the food and drink provided before the debate begins. He speaks for forty-five minutes rather than the allotted three.
Hospital Appointment	28 March 2007	Being a "busy terrible personality" we find Arthur in the middle of the official opening of a shoe shop, when posing for a photograph he mistakenly says "cheese" leading to a problem with Dyspepsia. During a visit to the Shoulder of Mutton it transpires that Arthur has been referred to the local hospital after a visit to his GP after a number of drinks he goes to the hospital but has missed his consultant. After mistaking a number of members of staff and dozing off he dreams that he is a famous consultant with unorthodox methods ("Let's save this man's life and we can have a post mortem afterwards"). He later discharges himself and returns to the pub, the true source of his ailment then becomes clear.
Ancient Egypt Speech	4 April 2007	The showbiz legend gives a lecture to impress the Egyptology Society, but there's a challenge for people wanting to attend, as the details on the poster Arthur designed has given the details in "hieroglyphics". Arthur has also defined a strict dress code.

=== Series 3 ===
Title	Airdate	Overview
Late Review	28 December 2007	Arthur is due to review a book for the BBC and whilst searching for it finds a pint of milk and half a dozen eggs down the back of the sofa "well that's a spot of lunch"; he also has to deal with a "non-recalcitrant" cat doing its "outrageous misdemeanours". Being unable to recall either the name or subject of the book Jeffrey is dispatched to retrieve a tea towel which has the same picture. A visit to the library and then the librarian's mother follows in the Arthur's search for the book. When finally he gets to the studio he has to bluff his way.
Car Boot	4 January 2008	Arthur picks a few select antiques to take to the local car-boot sale, where he is to hold a meat and theatrical memorabilia stall with Wilf, before negotiating the sale of a priceless family heirloom. Arthur also plans to carry out valuations for a small "constipation" and to video his performance to send to the BBC's "Antiques Roadkill". When at the sale Arthur has an uncomfortable encounter with the buyer of his heirloom and then carries out a confused valuation with the long-suffering Jeffrey.
The Advert	11 January 2008	Arthur is counting his loose change when Malcolm turns up looking for his "acting stagecraft and personality crafts lessons". When Arthur discovers that Malcolm is preparing for a casting for a toffee advert featuring a granddad he realises this is an opportunity for him to attend the audition. After a visit to the Shoulder of Mutton an improvisational session at the audition allows Arthur to exercise all his skills.
Arthur Goes Camping	18 January 2008	Arthur buys a tent for a camping trip to the "Brecon Beaklands" avoiding the idiot proof one that injured his "friend". He then pick up a flyer for a new "gastric pub" where he masquerades as a meeter and greeter, however the almost Communist number of owners lead to the premature end of his residency. After missing the "mini-bar" he ropes Jeffrey into driving him to Wales.
2001– A Space Idiocy	25 January 2008	Arthur decides it is time to join the 20th century by buying a mobile phone in the hope that it will help him compete with "Edward Woodworm" for work. He then becomes the victim of a scurrilous ear photographer before receiving a call offering him a job on the local hospital radio. Going home for a nap to repair he dreams of HAL from 2001: A Space Odyssey turning him into a baby. The slot on the hospital radio is then disrupted by the guest surgeon being called Hal and sounding remarkably similar to his dream.
Piddler on the Roof	1 February 2008	Arthur is staging a revue with songs from Fiddler on the Roof but due to a problem at the printers his fliers have an unfortunate misprint. Arthur visits his doctor's surgery in order to place one of his posters on the notice board. He discovers that his GP has died – "blimey that's not a very good advert for his business"—but then after looking for the lavatory he gets confused for a doctor, allowing him to dispense medical pearls of wisdom. A visit to the Shoulder of Mutton allows him to hand out "fly papers". After attempting to post a flier at Wilf's, Arthur receives a nasty knock on the head. A mixture of painkillers and a "medicainal bottle of spirits" leads to doubts about his ability to perform, but after a mixed grill the show must go on and Arthur performs concussed; "not be the first time I've performed concussed and I certainly hope it'll not be the last". The performance becomes increasingly erratic – "this is sodding Grease all over again, is this"

=== 2008 Special ===
Title
Role Playing
Airdate
25 August 2008
Overview
(Special recorded at the Edinburgh Festival)

After a visit from a new neighbour trying to deliver a letter, Arthur gets confused between the small ads and the personals in his local paper and ends up propositioning someone he believes to be selling a hedge trimmer. He then takes part in a doctor training session, role-playing the part of a patient, before retiring to the Shoulder of Mutton

=== Series 4 ===
Title	Airdate	Overview
Alf Ramsey's Kitchen Nightmare	7 January 2009	Arthur prepares to clean his bay window only to find his galvanised zinc bucket has been "burgalered" so he resorts to item 2 on his agenda, breakfast at Jerry's. After philosophising on the possibilities of a full Brazilian instead of the usual full English he discovers that Jerry has injured his back after falling over a bucket remarkably similar to the Arthur's. As the cafe is closed for the foreseeable future Arthur steps in and takes over the running of the Gerry's, doing an Alf Ramsey with Jeffrey acting as his "suicide" chef. Arthur attempts to move the cafe up-market organising a visit by local food "crickets" with predictable results before being re-united with the missing bucket.
An Audience With?	14 January 2009	Arthur is reading from his Novel "The Malteser Falcon" when he is interrupted by a visit from the vicar reminding him about a fund raiser for which Arthur is meant to be organising entertainment. As usual however Arthur has forgotten so has to hastily organise some "X Ray Factor" style auditions at the Shoulder of Mutton. Due to the low calibre of the candidates Arthur decides to put on An Audience with ... himself.
Pub Quiz	21 January 2009	Arthur is interviewed for the a local radio station about the proposed new by-pass before moving on to Gerry's. He discovers that Sally, Geoffrey and Wilf are all members of the Three Musketeers team in the Shoulder of Mutton's quiz night. Arthur soon invites himself to become team captain before organising Sally and Geoffrey into swatting up at the local library. When they convene at the Shoulder of Mutton Arthur manages to acquire numerous free drinks and novel flavoured crisps. Arthur's team is then joint first requiring him as team captain to take centre stage for the tie-breaker question.
Coach Trip	28 January 2009	Arthur postulates on the origin of the Zebra crossing, why no-one ever rides a Zebra and possible improvements in road safety before embarking on a day trip to Bridlington with the Legion. During a break at a service station he becomes detached from the rest of the group and is mistaken for an inspector from head office, allowing him to demonstrate his improvisational skills. Trying to board the wrong bus he is forced to hide in the ladies before going cross country and rejoining the coach four hours later. As usual the day ends in the Shoulder of Mutton.
Arthur's Aunt	4 February 2009	Arthur is gathering his costume and searching for his make-up when Malcolm arrives and is offered the position of Arthur's dresser for the role of Auntie Charlie in "The Man from Auntie's Uncle". When Arthur fails to find his valise Malcolm suggests they go for a free makeover at the local department store where Malcolm's cousin works on the make-up counter. After being transformed into a "spit of his Mother with a touch Margaret Lockwood, a handful of Anita Harris and a soup spoon (soupcon) of Brig Eggland". Unfortunately their efforts are to no avail as they become stuck in a lift and never make it to the auditions.
Documentary	11 February 2009	Arthur has a day-mare in which he hosts a request show on Radio Doncaster where he receives repeated requests for "Play Misty for Me", a tune which haunts him for the rest of the day. Jeffrey arrives and brings Arthur a cassette recorder as he is planning on making a documentary about his career in show-business, an idea which came to him on the lavatory where he has also storyboarded a quiz show, and other ideas on Izal toilet paper. Jeffrey is enlisted into operating the tape recorder for Arthur and following a visit Gerry's to interview him about Arthur, they move onto the Hippodrome where Arthur used to "top himself regularly in 1960 something", however the venue has changed use and Arthur makes the acquaintance of Pandora over a few glasses of champagne, followed by a warning from the local constabulary and a brief visit to the Shoulder of Mutton.

=== Series 5 ===
Title	Airdate	Overview
Beer Cruise	18 December 2009	Arthur sets off on a day trip to France with his friends Wilf, Sally and Geoffrey to buy cheap wine and beer. Having brushed up on his Francais the night before, Arthur tries to show them all how to communicate in a foreign tongue. Bizarrely, there does not appear to be any need to, as Arthur has great trouble finding any French people actually speaking French in France. Still, there's always the wine! A sly overdose on free samples at a Calais liquor warehouse soon leads Arthur to an encounter in Dreamland with SPECTRE supremo, Blofeld. Blimey!
Murder Most Fouled Up	25 December 2009	(From RT website) Arthur steps in at short notice to play a prominent role in a Murder Mystery evening for Lord and Lady Preston, his new best friends – if they did but know it! Who committed the heinous murder? Can Count Arthur solve the case? Did he do it? Was it the butler?
Keep Fit	1 January 2010	(From RT website) Not one to turn down a free dinner, when Arthur sees an advert in the paper for free trial membership of a new gym, there's no stopping him. There's just one thing – to qualify he has to get the doctor to give him a clean bill of health.
Yes Count Arthur	8 January 2010	Arthur decides to stand up for the 'little man' and seek high office in the local council elections after his local optician refuses to repair his decades-old reading glasses for free. "Hiring" Malcolm as his assistant campaign manager, the Count thirsts for his first chance to assess the madding crowd in his new role as people's politician. He gets that opportunity. It is his also his last. For this election cycle, at least. Because you have to register ages before Polling Day and not just do it the day before and rubbish like that. Plus, his audience are toddlers.
Cookery Book	15 January 2010	Arthur sniffs a chance at new fame with a celebrity cookery book proposal. Having landed an exploratory interview with a publisher, things swiftly head in the direction of downhill before trainwrecking Strong-style. Matters go from bad to bloody when Arthur follows the meeting with a stint in a sales stall flogging vegetable slicers for his pal Billy. Held the wrong way, the nifty device is a whizz at cutting your fingers, as the Count soon discovers...
The Musical	22 January 2010	(From RT website) Owing to the huge success of shows like Miss Signon, Cats and Annie Get Your Coat, Arthur decides 'his time is now' and devises his own autobiographical musical tribute to himself, Count Arthur Strong: The Musical. Hoping to raise the money to take it into the West End, Arthur performs highlights of the show to an invited audience of potential investors. Will he raise the money he needs to make his dream come true?

=== Series 6 ===
Title	Airdate	Overview
Citizen's Advice	15 December 2010	When Arthur attempts to return an item of clothing to a local shop, things don't go quite to plan – leading him to take some 'legal' advice at the Citizen's Advice Bureau. With an ever-increasing list of complaints, plus the possibility of having to acquire a puppy (or puppies) to boot, Arthur's day doesn't go quite as he'd hoped. The occasion does give him a chance to take a trip down memory lane, however, re-living an acting moment in a legal TV drama – which of course enables Arthur to give some sound advice of his own!
Calendar Boys	22 December 2010	Arthur is informed by Malcolm that there is an emergency meeting to be held in order to discuss raising funds for the local Church Hall, which is in dire straits and requires important improvements to remain open. In true Arthur style he comes up with an idea or two to help the fund-raising process, hoping to involve as many of his friends in the process. With an idea finally put to the committee and inevitably agreed to, after Arthur's persuasive words, the 'stage is set' for a fund-raising project that will surely turn heads and raise Arthur's personal profile as well as the much needed funding for the Church...
Tour Guide	29 December 2010	After meeting a Tour Operator in the street whilst doing his daily chores, Arthur joins a Tour Bus giving guided journeys around the city – and is, as only Arthur can be, hugely disappointed with his experience. Misunderstandings and misinformation abound, and after a stop to buy some pies from the market Arthur heads to the Shoulder of Mutton to talk through his annoyance at the day-so-far with Jack. He comes up with a plan to develop his very own and much improved tours of the city and, not having a bus at his disposal, decides to conduct walking tours. Whilst starting this new venture in earnest, Arthur's best-laid plans, as usual, don't quite go as he'd hoped...
The Curse of Count Arthur	5 January 2011	With all things 'horror' on his somewhat confused mind, Arthur receives a phone call from his good friend Barry Cryer to say that they have somehow lost Barry's briefcase containing the tickets they require to attend a lunchtime Hammer Horror convention at which they are due. They decide to re-trace their steps from the previous night, which includes taking in a visit to some local haunts and shops, as well as the Shoulder of Mutton. With the briefcase (and thus the tickets) nowhere to be found, Arthur and Barry are left to decide what they should do – try to get into the convention by relying on their good names and reputations alone, or risk missing out on the Hammer Horror lunch...?
Gone Fishing	13 January 2011	On a fishing trip to Spiggy Lakes with long suffering friends, Sally, Geoffrey and Wilf, things start to go awry for Arthur after he 'finds' a rowing boat. He thinks may give him the edge in their £5.10 per head sweepstake based on who will catch the most fish, and sets out into the lake unaccompanied.
Ship on a Bottle	19 January 2011	After problems assembling his model three masted schooner, Arthur goes in search of a free gift. After taking a well-earned break at Gerry's Cafe he sees an advert in the local paper which gives him an idea... All he has to do is express an interest in a 'no obligation' timeshare apartment in the Canary Isles, and the free gift is his! What could possibly go wrong?

=== Series 7 ===
Title	Airdate	Overview
The Minx	21 February 2012	After missing the bus to the market, Arthur plans to get his ancient Hillman Minx back on the road. He tries to get an insurance quote, which leads to him trying to get Terry Wogan to sign a waiver.
The Viewing	28 February 2012	Arthur views his neighbours' house and decides to take a look at the downstairs bathroom. He falls asleep and is still in the loo when the owners return. He hears news of his old friend Freddy Olmanroid that will take him to Spain.
Arthurish	7 March 2012	Arthur attempts to leave for Spain but after getting fed up of the similarity between languages, he attempts invents his own.
The Arrival	14 March 2012	Arthur arrives in Spain and is greeted by Miguel, a friend of Freddy's. He visits Freddy in the hospital before Freddy is about to undergo a heart bypass. Count Artur wishes him the 'best' and then leaves to go to the cabaret (named the wagon wheel). There he is greeted by the owner of an Irish pub next-door, who helps him set up the karaoke machine.
Spanish Elvis	21 March 2012	Arthur continues to run his friends bar / cabaret bar in Spain, meets Spanish Elvis and re-arranges the kitchen
Knights of the Round Table	28 March 2012	Returned from Spain, Arthur prepares for an interview with the Round Table but bangs his head and is even more confused than usual

=== 2014 Special ===
Title	Airdate	Overview
Arthur in Pantoland?	26 December 2014	Count Arthur is saved from the seemingly simple task of writing his Christmas cards by a call from the Vicar. An invitation to star in the local pantomime gets Arthur excited about possible return to the stage.

=== 2015 Special ===
Title	Airdate	Overview
The Christmas 'Do'	25 December 2015	Christmas creeps up on Arthur, leaving him little time to plan his festive arrangements, like the turkey.

=== 2016 Specials ===
Title	Airdate	Overview
The Scam	18 December 2016	As Christmas approaches and Arthur attempts to engineer his Christmas scotch from Secret Santa, he bumps into an old friend from his army days.
Randolph the Red-Nosed Reindeer	25 December 2016	After causing confusion with his Christmas nuts selection, Arthur attempts to round up reindeer and build Mount Fuji for his own Japanese themed Christmas wonderland.

=== 2017 Special ===
Title	Airdate	Overview
Bedbugs and Drumsticks	25 December 2017	The former variety star gets the opportunity to audition for a Christmas production of Bedknobs and Broomsticks.

=== 2018 Special ===
Title	Airdate	Overview
Doorknobs and Matchsticks	26 December 2018	Arthur returns with a celebratory 50th episode of his sitcom. The former variety star is understudy on a Christmas production of Bedknobs and Broomsticks. Will he get on stage?

=== 2019 Special ===
Title	Airdate	Overview
Good King Senseless	25 December 2019	Arthur sets about launching Malcom's singing career. Starting with some Christmas caroling, a bigger stage awaits.

=== 2020 Special ===
Title	Airdate	Overview
Poundsqueezers	25 December 2020	In the words of Count Arthur, 'Christmas isn't just about charity, it is about baby Judas riding a donkey'. To celebrate, he heads to the pound shop for his Christmas gifts.

=== 2021 Special ===
Title	Airdate	Overview
Away in a Mangle!	24 December 2021	How long will Arthur last in the role of Father Christmas this year? His annual attempt to spread festive cheer in a department store falls short - but will he be a great redeemer?

== Mint Extracts ==
On 11 June 2011, the recently relaunched radio station BBC Radio 4 Extra broadcast a three-hour special, Extra Strong - Count Arthur Speaks! Mint Extracts, embodying classic episodes of the first six series linked by exclusive new material featuring the Count in conversation with the show's producer Mark Radcliffe. It has since been repeated several times.

== Television series ==
The character of Count Arthur Strong was rebooted by Steve Delaney and a new co-writer Graham Linehan with the 2013 BBC sitcom Count Arthur Strong which was broadcast for six half-hour weekly episodes from 8 July 2013. The television project heralds a new chapter in the life of Count Arthur Strong; the series is set in London rather than Doncaster (although neither made frequent reference to their real-world setting). None of the supporting characters from the radio programme are featured, although subtle background references are made to the radio characters (Wilf's butcher's shop appears in the background of a shot, for example). Two further series have since been broadcast, although in 2017 the BBC announced that it would not be commissioning further series.

== Honours ==
In 2009, Count Arthur Strong's Radio Show! won the Gold Sony Radio Academy Award in comedy.

In 2016, Count Arthur Strong's Radio Show! won the Best Radio Sitcom from the British Comedy Guide.
