= Count Arthur Strong (TV series) =

British TV sitcom (2013–2017)

- Genre: Sitcom
- Created by: Steve Delaney; Graham Linehan
- Based on: Count Arthur Strong's Radio Show! by Steve Delaney
- Written by: Steve Delaney; Graham Linehan
- Directed by: Graham Linehan
- Starring: Steve Delaney; Rory Kinnear; Andy Linden; Ruth Posner; Dave Plimmer; Chris Ryman; Zahra Ahmadi
- Composer: Jon Boden
- Country of origin: United Kingdom
- Original language: English
- No. of series: 3
- No. of episodes: 20

Production
- Executive producers: Richard Daws; Jon Rolph; Gregor Sharp
- Producer: Richard Boden
- Running time: 30 minutes
- Production companies: Komedia Entertainment; Delightful Industries; Retort TV

Original release
- Network: BBC Two (2013); BBC One (2015–2017)
- Release: 8 July 2013 – 14 July 2017

Count Arthur Strong is a BBC sitcom written by Steve Delaney and Graham Linehan. Delaney portrays the title character in the series, a stage creation of Delaney's who has also featured in the BBC Radio 4 programme Count Arthur Strong's Radio Show!

== Plot ==
The series begins with the meeting of Count Arthur Strong, an eccentric, septuagenarian, former music hall performer, with Michael Baker, the bookish son of his former comedy partner.

The television project heralds a new chapter in the life of Count Arthur Strong as compared to the character in the radio series: none of the characters from the radio programme are featured (Geoffrey, Wilf Taylor, Sally Marsden etc) and the series is set in London in and around Arthur's home and his local café rather than in Doncaster. The café is run by its belligerent Turkish owner Bulent who is helped by his sister Sinem; the other main characters are the regular pension-age customers at the cafe.

== Cast ==
- Steve Delaney as Count Arthur Strong, an elderly, pompous, out-of-work actor from Doncaster with delusions that he is a show-business legend. The character has been described as "a mixture of physical and mental clumsiness, mirthful malapropisms and Tourettic tics, whose pride forbids him from ever conceding fallibility, even as his world crashes around him".
- Rory Kinnear as Michael Baker, a writer. Michael, a shy, bookish, often childlike, effeminate and pathetic man, is using Arthur's anecdotes to help write his late father's biography.
- Chris Ryman as Bulent, the irascible, hot-tempered owner of Arthur's local café, who is constantly irritated by Arthur's bumbling.
- Zahra Ahmadi as Sinem, Bulent's younger sister with a mischievous sense of humour.
- Andy Linden as John the Watch, an enigmatic regular at the café and close friend of Arthur's.
- Dave Plimmer as Eggy the human billboard, a quiet, gentle, melancholic café regular, whose sign (possibly inspired by that of Stanley Green) reflects his obsession with the supposed evils of eggs and other conspiracy theories.
- Ruth Posner as Katya, a café regular and Arthur's greatest fan. (Series 1)
- Bronagh Gallagher as Birdy, a café regular (Series 3)

== Production ==
In 2009, it was reported that Delaney would be working on making a television version of Count Arthur Strong's Radio Show! for Talkback Thames and BBC Two, and further that Graham Linehan and Jeremy Dyson were working on a project for TV called Count Arthur Strong's Entertainment Game. The quiz show format was subsequently dropped in favour of a sitcom.

The first series was recorded in front of a live audience from January to February 2013 at Pinewood Studios. The first episode of Count Arthur Strong was recorded on 10 January 2013 at Pinewood Studios. Written by Steve Delaney and Graham Linehan, it co-starred Rory Kinnear as the son of the recently deceased Max Baker, Count Arthur's erstwhile comedy partner. Michael Baker (Kinnear) sets out to track down Count Arthur after the death of his father in order to write a biography.

== Episodes ==
=== Series overview ===
Series	Episodes	Originally aired	
Series	Episodes	First aired	Last aired
1	6	8 July 2013	13 August 2013
2	7	6 January 2015	17 February 2015
3	7	19 May 2017	14 July 2017

=== Series 1 (2013) ===
The first series was shown on BBC Two.

No. overall	No. in series	Title	Directed by	Written by	Original release date
1	1	"Memory Man"	Graham Linehan	Steve Delaney & Graham Linehan	8 July 2013
Michael Baker tracks down Count Arthur Strong, a music hall performer and former partner of Michael's recently deceased father, for help with his father's biography.
2	2	"Arthur.com"	Graham Linehan	Steve Delaney & Graham Linehan	15 July 2013
Michael gives Arthur a laptop in return for helping him write his father's biography.
3	3	"The Radio Play"	Graham Linehan	Steve Delaney & Graham Linehan	22 July 2013
Arthur is given a small role in a radio play when the original actor is unable to attend the recording.
4	4	"Arthur's Big Moment"	Graham Linehan	Steve Delaney & Graham Linehan	30 July 2013
The customers lock themselves in to the café's back room during a riot. Arthur takes the opportunity to entertain this captive audience with his one-man musical act.
5	5	"Doctor Two"	Graham Linehan	Steve Delaney & Graham Linehan	6 August 2013
After Michael is bitten by one of Arthur's dog-sitting dogs, he and Arthur pay a visit to the hospital. Their friend Katya comes with them but dies unexpectedly.
6	6	"The Seance"	Graham Linehan	Steve Delaney & Graham Linehan	13 August 2013
The café clientele are depressed after the death of Katya. Arthur holds a seance in an attempt to contact her to say a final goodbye.

=== Series 2 (2015) ===
The second series of Count Arthur Strong sees a shift to BBC One and a later time slot of 10:35pm.

No. overall	No. in series	Title	Directed by	Written by	Original release date
7	1	"The Heist"	Graham Linehan	Steve Delaney & Graham Linehan	6 January 2015
Michael returns, to discover that Arthur has written a novel, which is now sitting in his agent's office. However, when Michael learns that Arthur's book is full of salacious gossip about her, he and the café gang stage a heist to retrieve the manuscript.
8	2	"The Day the Clocks Went Back"	Graham Linehan	Steve Delaney & Graham Linehan	13 January 2015
A broken heart and the clocks going back leads to a mix-up at 3,000 feet, where Arthur is mistaken for a flying instructor.
9	3	"We're Listening"	Graham Linehan	Steve Delaney & Graham Linehan	20 January 2015
Spurred on by sleepless nights and noise pollution on his street, Arthur decides to run for local elections.
10	4	"Stuck in the Middle"	Graham Linehan	Steve Delaney & Graham Linehan	27 January 2015
A conman rues the day he tangled with Arthur.
11	5	"Still Life"	Graham Linehan	Steve Delaney & Graham Linehan	3 February 2015
When a documentary team start to do a profile of Michael, Arthur's new career as a living statue threatens to steal the show.
12	6	"The Affair"	Graham Linehan	Steve Delaney & Graham Linehan	10 February 2015
In the aftermath of yet another 'trouser fire', Arthur moves in temporarily with Michael.
13	7	"Fame at Last"	Graham Linehan	Steve Delaney & Graham Linehan	17 February 2015
Arthur gets a job as a television psychic and the resulting fame starts to go to his head.

=== Series 3 (2017) ===
The third series started on 19 May 2017 on BBC One, at the earlier timeslot of 8:30 p.m. Broadcasts were delayed in the first half of June due to the 2017 UK election and moved to BBC Two due to Wimbledon, while the episode "Safari Park" was pushed to the end of the series' broadcast due to the death of a zookeeper in late May.

No. overall	No. in series	Title	Directed by	Written by	Original release date
14	1	"Count Arthur's House of Horrors"	Graham Linehan	Steve Delaney & Graham Linehan	19 May 2017
Arthur is enlisted to rid a haunted house of its demonic occupants.
15	2	"Arthur the Hat"	Graham Linehan	Steve Delaney & Graham Linehan	26 May 2017
Michael is summoned for jury duty and some of John the Watch's old criminal associates take an interest in Bulent's cafe.
16	3	"Safari Park"	Graham Linehan	Steve Delaney & Graham Linehan	14 July 2017 (originally scheduled for 23 June 2017)
Michael finds himself with a whole new family on a birthday outing, but Arthur's money-saving schemes cause chaos.
17	4	"The Soupover"	Graham Linehan	Steve Delaney & Graham Linehan	23 June 2017
What begins as a day spent together at Arthur's home sampling soup, turns into something somewhat more bizarre.
18	5	"The Three Wishes"	Graham Linehan	Steve Delaney & Graham Linehan (with additional material by Graham Fellows)	30 June 2017
Arthur attempts to build bridges with a surprising figure from his past. Guest starring Fellows in character as John Shuttleworth.
19	6	"The Lucky Streak"	Graham Linehan	Steve Delaney & Graham Linehan	7 July 2017
Arthur mistakenly becomes a Scientologist while in search of free biscuits, and his life and luck change.
20	7	"Untrue Detective"	Graham Linehan	Steve Delaney & Graham Linehan	16 June 2017
A knock on the head results in Arthur joining the police force as a high-ranking detective. It's up to Michael and the gang from the cafe to bring him back to reality.

== Broadcast history ==
The first series of six episodes was broadcast on BBC Two on 8 July 2013, with one episode each week airing thereafter. The first episode was watched by 971,000 viewers, less than half of BBC Two's slot average over the previous three months. Episodes 4, 5 and 6 were subsequently moved from Mondays, 8.30 pm, on BBC Two, to Tuesdays, 8 pm, on the same channel.

The second series aired on BBC One rather than BBC Two. The series was recorded at Pinewood Studios between 6 June 2014 and 18 July 2014. The second series began broadcasting on BBC One on 6 January 2015.

The third and final series was recorded at Pinewood Studios in August 2016. It was due for broadcast later that same year, but was pushed back to 2017.

== Reception ==
=== Awards ===
The first series of Count Arthur Strong was nominated for three British Comedy Awards – Best Sitcom, Best New Comedy and Steve Delaney being nominated for Best Comedy Breakthrough Artist. Steve Delaney and Graham Linehan were nominated as Best Comedy Writers at the 2014 BAFTA Craft Awards and the show was also nominated for Best Situation Comedy at the 2014 BAFTA awards.

== Home media ==
The first series of Count Arthur Strong was released on 19 August 2013. In September 2013, BBC WorldWide recalled all the DVDs due to a picture fault. Series two of Count Arthur Strong was released on DVD by Network on 26 September 2016. Series 3 was released by Network on DVD on 17 July 2017 with a Complete Series 1-3 Boxset released by Network on 26 February 2018.
