= Character comedy =

Comedy genre

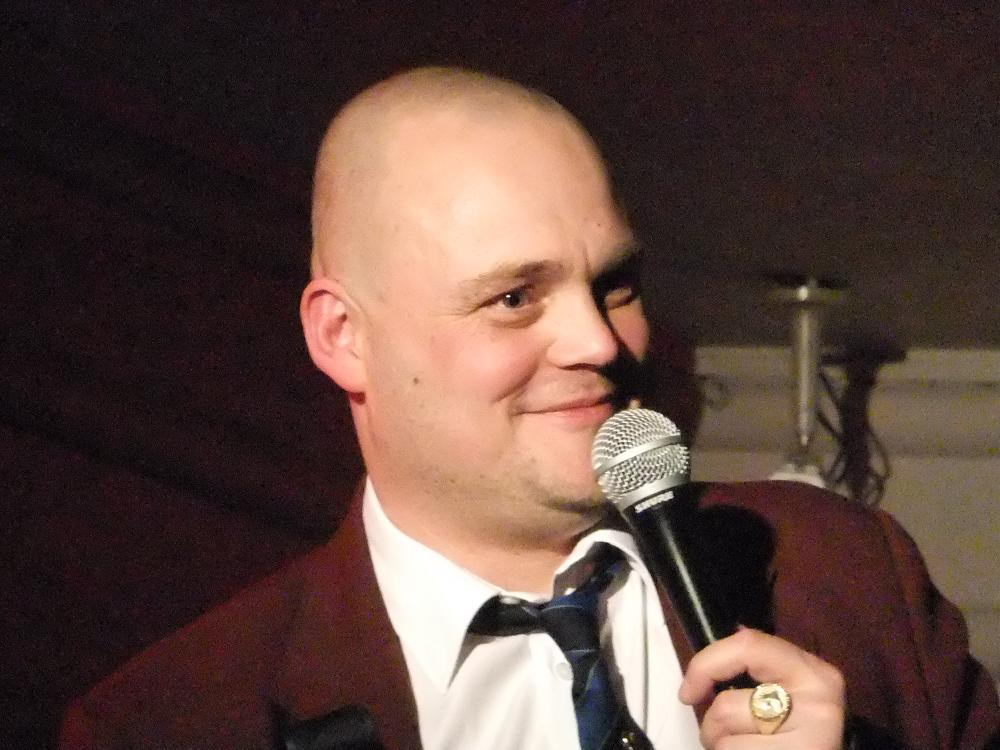
Al Murray as the Pub Landlord

Character comedy is a genre in which a stand-up comedian performs as a character they have created. Examples include Al Murray's crotchety Pub Landlord and Rich Hall's musician "uncle" Otis Lee Crenshaw; both of these won the Perrier Award at the Edinburgh Comedy Awards. Diane Morgan's character Philomena Cunk and Steve Delaney's Count Arthur Strong are further examples. Another example is Seinfeld.
