= Steve Delaney =

English comedian (born 1954)

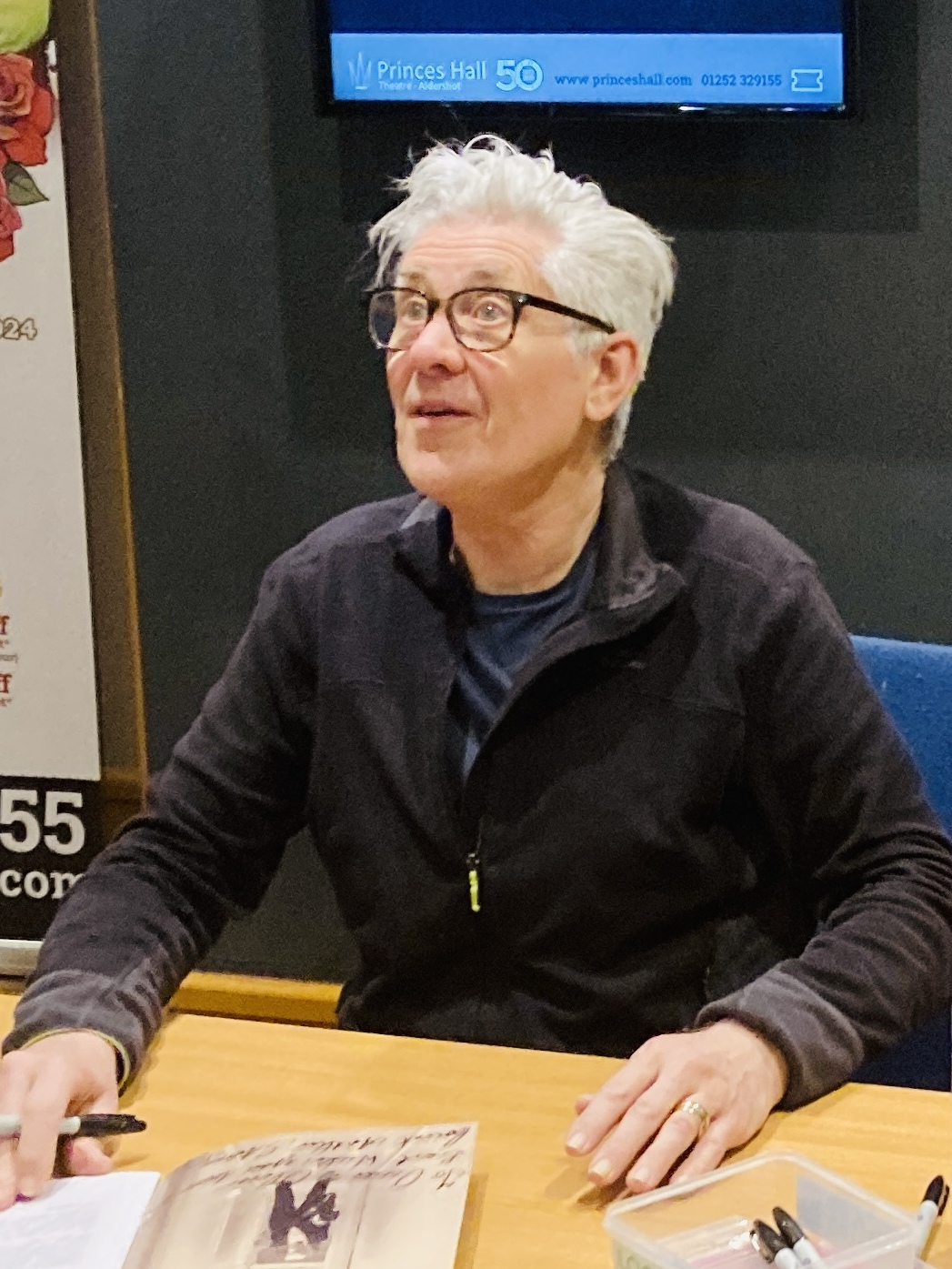
Steve Delaney after a performance as Count Arthur Strong in 2024

Steve Delaney (born 1954) is an English comedian and character actor, best known for his comedy character Count Arthur Strong on BBC Radio 4 and then a television sitcom broadcast on BBC2 and BBC1.

== Early life and career ==
Delaney was born in Leeds, where his father was a foundryman and his mother a seamstress. He left school to work on a market stall in Leeds Indoor Market, taking roles in amateur dramatics. After some theatre workshop courses, headed by David Morton, the then Leeds Education Authority Inspector for Drama, Delaney had a period at Jacob Kramer College of Art. After leaving he worked briefly for a commercial and industrial photographer and as a commercial artist. After crewing many shows at the Leeds Grand Theatre he became an assistant stage manager at the Leeds Playhouse and then stage manager for Leeds Theatre in Education in his native city, and then a theatre carpenter at the Northcott Theatre in Exeter.

In 1979 he enrolled at the Central School of Speech and Drama in London, graduating in 1982. To support himself he also worked as a carpenter and his agent would sometimes fix up the occasional carpentry job for him as well as acting roles. Whilst at Central he first hit upon the idea of a character that went on to become Count Arthur Strong.

== Count Arthur Strong ==
The fictional character Count Arthur Strong is an elderly, pompous, mostly out-of-work, deluded thespian from Doncaster, Yorkshire, who appears to have attention deficit disorder and memory loss. He is apt to use malapropisms in his attempts to sound educated. Count Arthur played the character Dickie Bow in The Remains of Foley and McColl in 2000. He appeared in Count Arthur Strong's Radio Show!, a series that was commissioned by BBC Radio 4 from 2005 to December 2021's Christmas Special, and is the central character in the BBC2 sitcom Count Arthur Strong, which first aired on 8 July 2013.

Count Arthur is based on many influences and people from Delaney's youth from the 1960s onward: next-door neighbours, relatives, and eccentric shopkeepers.

=== Character history ===
Delaney created Count Arthur in the 1980s, when he was a drama student at Central School of Speech and Drama in London, and performed him at the end-of-term show, having drawn inspiration from characters he met during his childhood. But he put the character to one side for several years, during which he worked as an actor, appearing in television in dramas including Juliet Bravo, The Flying Lady, Casualty, The Bill, All Creatures Great and Small and Agatha Christie's Poirot.

In 1997 Delaney resurrected Count Arthur Strong at the suggestion of former tutor and friend Lyall Watson, now an award-winning TV writer, for his character comedy routine in clubs. The character was performed at the Edinburgh Festival for several years and BBC Radio 4 launched a series for him in 2005 entitled Count Arthur Strong's Radio Show! A second radio series was recorded at the Komedia theatre, Brighton, and broadcast on Radio 4 in 2007. By 2012 the show had run to seven series. The radio show has continued through a number of Christmas Specials up to December 2017, when the two Christmas Specials won the comedy.co.uk award for Best Radio Sitcom, voted for by the public. The series also won the Sony Gold Comedy Award, the highest accolade for radio comedy, at the Radio Academy Awards in 2009.

Delaney then entered an intensive period of production, amounting to more than 350 live shows performed over five further Edinburgh Fringe runs and nine national tours. This covered live shows from "Forgotten Egypt!" to "Alive and Unplugged" in 2018.

In 2004 the character stepped onto national radio after a series of speculative pilots recorded at Komedia Brighton. Count Arthur first appeared on BBC Radio 2 as a regular guest on the Mark Radcliffe show, before featuring in his own BBC Radio 4 sitcom, Count Arthur Strong's Radio Show! Produced by Komedia Entertainment and Smooth Operations, the show won the Sony Award for Best Radio Comedy in 2009 and became a cornerstone of BBC Radio comedy; almost 50 half-hour episodes were broadcast between 2005 and 2012.

In 2008 Delaney and Komedia Entertainment partnered with Graham Linehan and Talkback to create a TV version of the radio series. A quiz show format called The Entertainment Game was piloted in 2010 for the BBC, which was followed by the commissioning of scripts for a sitcom for BBC Two that became Count Arthur Strong.
