= Andy Linden (actor) =

English actor (born 1954)

- Born: 1954 (age 71–72); England
- Occupation: Actor
- Years active: 1988–present

Andy Linden is an English actor. He is known for his roles in EastEnders, Count Arthur Strong and Not Going Out, as well as portraying Mundungus Fletcher in Harry Potter and the Deathly Hallows – Part 1.

== Filmography ==
=== Film ===
Year	Title	Role	Notes
1996	Punch	(unknown)	Short film
1998	Love Is the Devil: Study for a Portrait of Francis Bacon	Ken Bidwell	
2001	Lucky Break	Kenny	
2001	From Hell	Carpenter	
2002	The Case	Sid the Sleaze	
2002	The Visitor	Countryman	
2005	The Business	Joe	
2005	Oliver Twist	Mr. Gamfield	
2007	Little Things	Newsagent	Short film
2007	Rise of the Footsoldier	Peter Dunsdale	
2007	Mad, Sad & Bad	Freddy	
2007	The Story of...	Baz's Dad	
2008	RocknRolla	Waster	
2008	The Secret of Moonacre	Marmaduke Scarlet	
2009	Remarkable Guide to the Orchestra	Alpine Roadie	
2010	Huge	Sidekick	
2010	Harry Potter and the Deathly Hallows – Part 1	Mundungus Fletcher	
2011	Ghosted	Steve	
2011	Big Fat Gypsy Gangster	Left-Handed Lenny	Straight-to-DVD
2014	Robot Overlords	Knife Man	
2014	Peterman	Tone	
2015	Rise of the Footsoldier Part II	Reg	
2016	The Chop	Morris	Short film
2017	Trendy	Harry	
2024	Nearly Never	Bill	Short film

=== Television ===
Year	Title	Role	Notes
1988	The Management	Typhus Los Bentos	6 episodes
1988	Cabaret at the Jongleurs	Barman	4 episodes
1988	The Return of Shelley	Mehmet	Episode 1.4: "One of Those Nights"
1988, 1993	Hale and Pace	Various characters	5 episodes
1989	Tales of Sherwood Forest	Barker	Episode 1.5: "Stag Night"
1990	Davro	Various characters	2 episodes
1990	A Bit of Fry & Laurie	Various characters	Episode 2.4
1990	Chancer	Dink	11 episodes
1990	Drop the Dead Donkey	Arab	Episode 1.8: "The Root of All Evil"
1991	London's Burning	Stall Owner	Episode 4.1
1991	Paul Merton: The Series	Various characters	Episode 1.2
1991	Birds of a Feather	Andy	Episode 3.12: "Business"
1991	Gone to the Dogs	Milkie	Mini-series; 3 episodes
1991–2009	The Bill	Various roles	7 episodes
1992	The Pall Bearer's Revue	Various characters	2 episodes
1992	KYTV	Farting man in audience	Episode 2.1: "KY Tellython"
1992	Covington Cross	Cook	Episode 1.7: "The Persecution"
1992	Gone to Seed	Big Ron	3 episodes
1993	Bonjour la Classe	Reporter	Episode 1.3: "Viva la Revolution"
1993	Teenage Health Freak	Draco's Dad	Episode 2.3
1993	ScreenPlay	Luigi	Episode 8.4: "Safe"
1994	The All New Alexei Sayle Show	Various characters	2 episodes
1994	Jo Brand Through the Cakehole	Various characters	2 episodes
1994	The Day Today	Various characters	Pilot episode
1995	Bramwell	Paul	Episode 1.2
1995	Agatha Christie's Poirot	Giorgios	Episode 6.2: "Hickory Dickory Dock"
1995	Mud	Vic	Episode 2.1
1995	The Famous Five	Jake	Episode 1.5: "Five Fall inro Adventure"
1995	The Ghostbusters of East Finchley	Laughing John	3 episodes
1995	The World of Lee Evans	Charlie	Episode 1.4: "Mr. Confidence / Special Delivery"
1996	Lord of Misrule	Thug	Television film
1996	2point4 Children	Eegore	Episode 6.2: "The Lady Vanishes"
1997	Next of Kin	Nobby	Episode 3.5: "The Narrow Boat"
1997	Scene	Alcoholic	Episode 29.9: "Skinny Marink"
1998	Comedy Nation	Various characters	Unknown episodes
1998	Getting Hurt	Guido	Television film
1998	Bramwell	Albert	Episode 4.2: "Loose Women"
1998	Get Real	Burglar	Episode 1.4: "Parking"
1998	Duck Patrol	Kev	Episode 1.6: "River Rage"
1999	Roger Roger	Spanner	Episode 2.7: "Love Rules the Heart, Money Takes the Soul"
1999	Harry Hill	Various characters	Episode 3.0: "Christmas Memory Lane of Laughter"
2000	Lock, Stock...	Trevor Truscott	Episode 1.2: "...And 200 Smoking Kalashnikovs"
2000	Take a Girl Like You	Club Doorman	Mini-series; episode 2
2001	Lee Evans: So What Now?	Pikey Pauly	Episode 1.7: "The Limo"
2002	Heartbeat	Lennie	Episode 11.13: "The Leopard's Spots"
2003	EastEnders	Small Chris	1 episode
2003	State of Play	Hotel Receptionist	Mini-series; episode 3
2003	The Private Life of Samuel Pepys	John Jones	Television film
2005	Bleak House	Pawnbroker	Mini-series; episode 1
2006	All in the Game	Foxi the Fan	Television film
2007	Rome	Procurator	Episode 2.4: "Testudo et Lepus (The Tortoise and the Hare)"
2007	Supernormal	Baby Brother (voice)	Episode 1.7: "Beware of Baby Brother!"
2008	The Invisibles	Foreman	Mini-series; episode 4
2008	New Tricks	Bob Shelford	Episode 5.1: "Spare Parts"
2008	Merlin	Devlin	Episode 1.2: "Valiant"
2009	Garrow's Law	Mr. Sibley	3 episodes
2009	Being Danny's Dire	Ronnie the Rammer	Television film
2009, 2014	Not Going Out	Neighbour	Episodes 3.5: "Neighbour" and 7.10: "Wedding"
2010	Law & Order: UK	Dom Mason	Episode 4.4: "Duty of Care"
2011	Little Crackers	Stuntman	Episode 2.4: "Harry Hill's Little Cracker: Your Face"
2012	Hunderby	Harold Nimpson	Episode 1.5
2012–2013	Stella	Big Rae	6 episodes
2013	It's Kevin	Various characters	2 episodes
2013–2017	Count Arthur Strong	John the Watch	20 episodes (series 1–3)
2014	Power to the People	Big Brian	Television film
2014–2015	Man Down	Barry	Episodes 1.8: "Finding Nesta" and 2.5: "Dennis"
2015	Brilliantman!	Window Cleaner	Television short film
2016	Doctor Thorne	Winterbones	Mini-series; episode 1
2016	The Musketeers	Street Trader	Episode 3.2: "The Hunger"
2017	Quacks	Fitz the Guard	Episodes 1.1: "The Duke's Tracheotomy" and 1.5: "The Bishop's Appendix"
2018	Damned	Tel	Episode 2.6
2021	The Larkins	Vernon	Episode 1.4: "In Which the Larkins Rescue the Railway Station"
2023	Silo	Elderly Man	Episode 1.3: "Machines"
2023	Doctors	Chris Padmore	Episode 24.90: "Crime Never Pays?"

=== Video games ===
Year	Title	Role (voice)	Notes
2010	Harry Potter and the Deathly Hallows – Part I	Mundungus Fletcher	
2014	Lego The Hobbit	Additional voices	
2017	Warhammer 40,000: Dawn of War III	Zappnoggin	
