= Northcott Theatre =

Theatre in Exeter, Devon, England

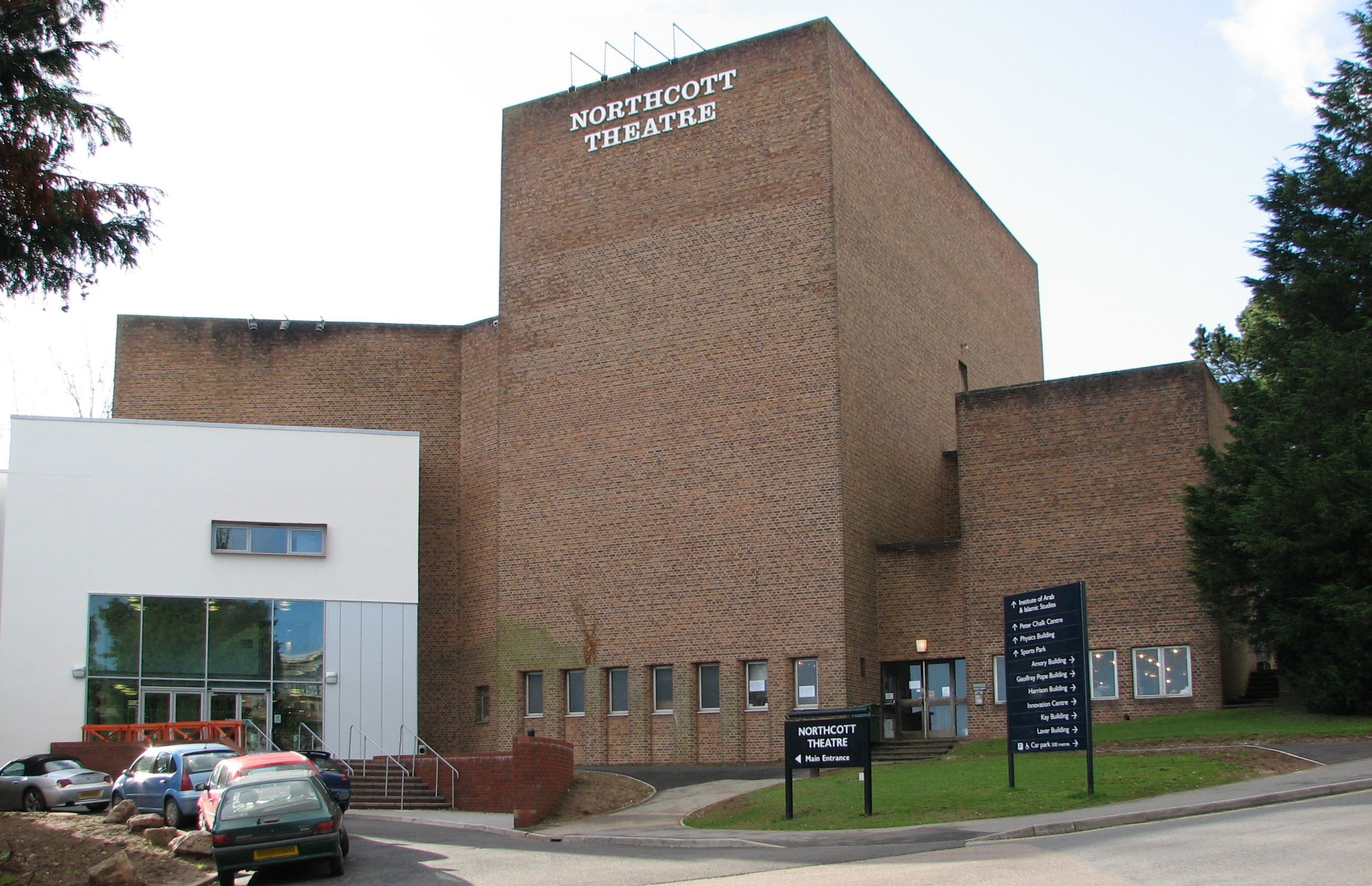
- The Northcott Theatre after its 2007 refurbishment.
- Interactive map of Northcott Theatre
- Address: Exeter
- Coordinates: 50.7358°N 3.5352°W
- Capacity: 464 seats
- Production: Visiting performances

Construction
- Opened: 1967

Website
- http://www.exeternorthcott.co.uk

The Northcott Theatre is a theatre situated on the Streatham Campus of the University of Exeter, Exeter, Devon, England. It opened in 1967 and was run until 2010 by the Northcott Theatre Foundation, when the company ceased operating after a period in administration. The theatre is now known as Exeter Northcott Theatre and became a registered charity (no. 1151620) in June 2013.

== History ==
Designed by Sir William Holford and Partners, the theatre opened on 2 November 1967 with a production of The Merchant of Venice, starring their artistic director, Tony Church. Barbara Hepworth unveiled one of her sculptures in the foyer on opening night.

Actors who spent time in the Northcott company in their earlier careers include Polly James, Lesley Joseph, John Nettles, Robert Lindsay, Brian Protheroe, Bob Peck, Geraldine James, Paul Jesson, Joanna Tope, Caroline John, Celia Imrie, Nick Brimble and Imelda Staunton; and Nicholas Hytner professionally directed his first straight dramas here. In its first years, the company originated a number of plays of West Country interest, including new historical drama by Jack Emery and an adaptation of the Ordinalia, the Cornish Mystery Play Cycle. It also toured productions throughout the area. The public areas hosted a changing display of art.

The Northcott has a strong history as a producing repertory theatre, that is to say the bulk of its historical productions were staged by the company itself, rather than being brought in from elsewhere. As built the theatre was given a semicircular main house auditorium seating 433 people with an orchestra pit on a mechanical lift; being also configurable as theatre in the round or cinema. The capacity of the venue was increased in the 2007 refurbishment and it can now seat 464.

== Expansion ==
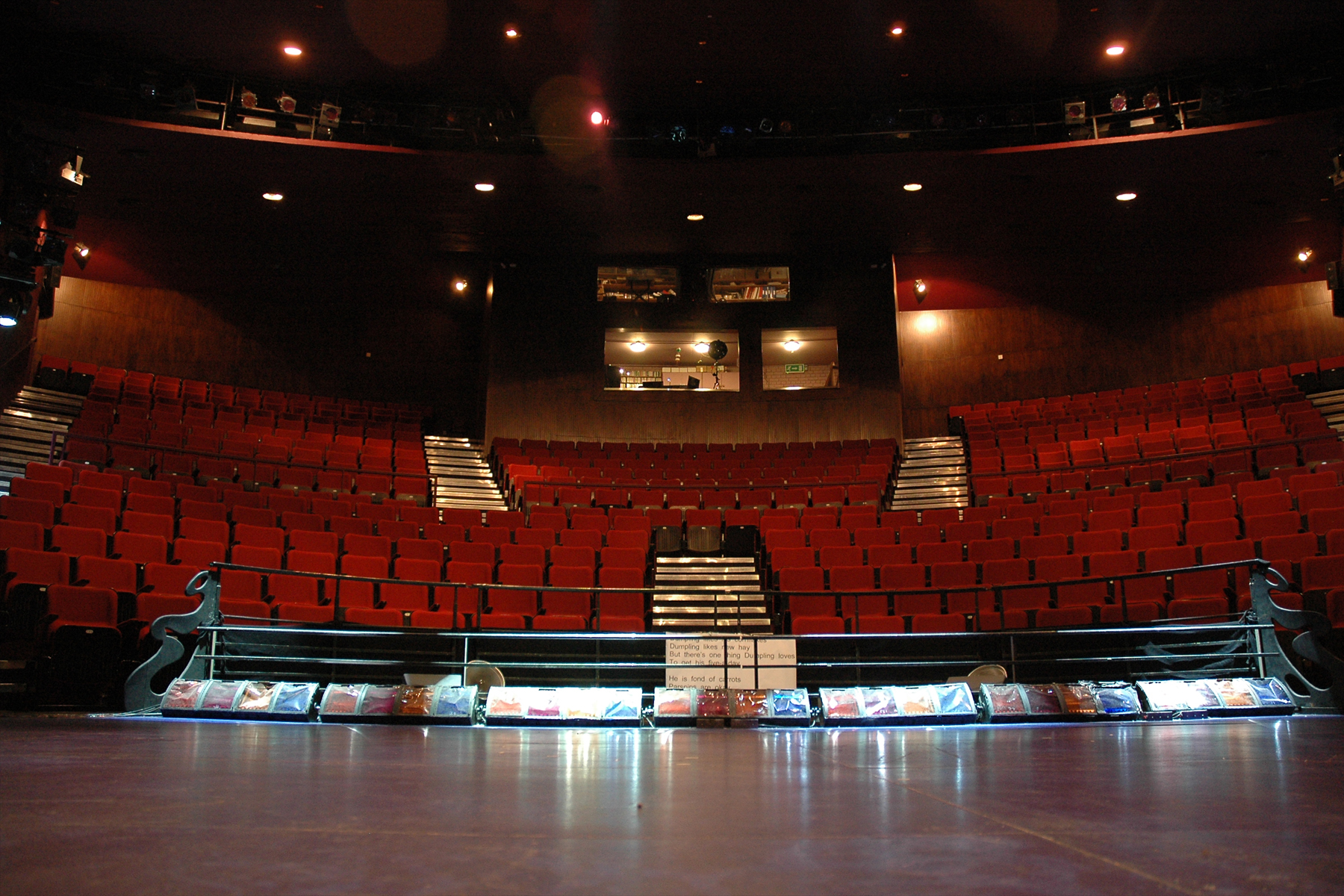
The auditorium in 2011

In March 2005, the directors of the Northcott announced that planning permission and funding would be sought for a £3.1 million building project to expand front of house facilities and increase the capacity of the auditorium to 538 seats.

Having raised £2.1 million, the theatre was closed for refurbishment in January 2007 and reopened on 12 December 2007, near the fortieth anniversary of its first opening.

The refurbishment provided the following;

- New auditorium seating
- Additional wheelchair spaces
- A lift to all public levels, providing full disabled access
- Improved disabled facilities
- Redecorated and upgraded public areas
- Additional space for eating and drinking in the foyer
- An enhanced entrance area
- Refurbished and improved technical areas

The day before the rebranded Exeter Northcott reopened in December 2007, Arts Council England threatened withdrawal of its entire £547,000 annual grant. The loss of a third of the theatre's operating costs would result in a drastic cutback in production and job losses, if the theatre even managed to stay open. However, on 1 February 2008 the Arts Council England announced a reprieve for the Exeter Northcott and its continued funding.

Following the discovery of a legacy of accounting problems inherited from the previous management, the trustees placed the theatre into administration on 25 February 2010. This decision was opposed by Arts Council England which had earlier sent in a forensic accountant to investigate the extent of the problem. These investigations had not yet been completed. Geoff Myers, chairman of the theatre's trustees, said: "We took this decision with a heavy heart but when presented with the latest financial information we had no choice but to place the theatre into administration. It is to be hoped that a way can be found to effect a rescue of the theatre." Exeter City Council and the university agreed to help find a way to save the theatre. On 5 June 2010 it was confirmed by administrators Begbies Traynor that a new company set up by the university had purchased the theatre, the Exeter Northcott Theatre Company, and the immediate future of the theatre was thought to have been secured. In September 2014 Exeter Northcott Theatre announced a new major sponsorship agreement with law firm Browne Jacobson. In 2015, under Artistic and Executive Director Paul Jepson, the theatre returned to producing its own work with A Christmas Carol followed by Betrayal, by Harold Pinter, in 2016. In 2017, the theatre made a return to producing its own pantomime with Dick Whittington, directed by Tony Lidington. In January 2018 a performance exploring epilepsy and created by the theatre in collaboration with the University of Exeter, Beyond My Control, went on a national tour

== Artistic directors ==
- 1967–1971: Tony Church (artistic director), Robin Phillips (associate director), Bernard Goss (Writer in Residence)
- 1971–1974: Jane Howell (artistic director), Jack Emery & Kevin Robinson (associate directors)
- 1974–1977: Geoffrey Reeves (artistic director), Clive Barker (associate director)
- 1978–1980: Richard Digby Day (artistic director), Michael Winter & Crispin Thomas (associate directors)
- 1981–1985: Stewart Trotter (artistic director)
- 1986–1990: George Roman (artistic director), Martin Harvey (associate director)
- 1991–1998: John Durnin (artistic director), Tim Carroll (associate director), Charlotte Conquest & Gillian King (assistant directors), Robert Shearman (Writer in Residence)
- 1998–2008: Ben Crocker (artistic director)
- 2008–2010: Rebecca Manson Jones (position retitled to 'Creative Director')
- 2015–2018: Paul Jepson (artistic and executive director)
- 2018-2022: Daniel Buckroyd (Artistic and executive director)
- 2022-2023: Kelly Johnson and Emma Stephenson (Interim Co-CEOs)
- 2023 - : Martin Berry (Creative Director), Kelly Johnson (Director of Marketing and Development), Emma Stephenson (Director of Operations and Finance). All 3 also serve as Joint-Chief Executives.

== See also ==
- Barnfield Theatre
