= Ruth Posner =

Polish-British actress (1929–2025)

Ruth Posner BEM (née Wajsberg; died 23 September 2025) was a Polish-born British Holocaust survivor, dancer and choreographer, actress and a member of the Royal Shakespeare Company.

== Early life ==
Rutenka Wajsberg was born in Warsaw, Poland; her birth date is reported variously as 1933 or 20 April 1929. She was the only child of Moshe Wajsberg, an accountant and artist and a non-observant Jew, and his wife Anna, an underwear designer. During the Holocaust the family were ousted from their home by the Gestapo and sent to the Warsaw Ghetto. In 1942 her father arranged for Ruth and her aunt to go to work at a Jewish-owned leather factory outside the ghetto walls, and from here they both escaped. Posner survived the remainder of the war by pretending to be a young Polish Catholic girl called Irena Slabowska. She was aided in this deception by the fact that she and her parents had always spoken Polish together rather than Yiddish. It is believed that her parents were murdered in Treblinka.

As a nine-year old, Posner was faced with a life-or-death decision: She knew that if she tried to break out that she would most likely be shot or die anyway staying at the ghetto. She and her aunt took that risk and escaped, making it out of the ghetto walls alive. As for Posner's parents, they did not. Posner had an idea of what happened to her parents, but was unable to verify it. Posner experienced another tragedy at the age of thirteen. Her hometown, Warsaw, was evacuated and she was moved to Germany. At that time, she was still known as "the little Catholic girl". She was taken as a prisoner of war to Germany, not as a Jew. Being a prisoner in Germany was not as bad as being a child in the concentration camps. In Germany, she was tortured but not beaten. After the war with Germany was over she moved to the UK, where she spent the rest of her life. In the last 25 years of her life, she appeared in a play about her life, called Who Do We Think We Are, choreographed plays, acted in films, danced, and wrote a book.

Arriving in the United Kingdom as a refugee at the end of World War II, Posner married Michael in 1950. In the 1950s she became a dancer and choreographer with the London Contemporary Dance School. In the early 1970s her husband went to New York to work for UNICEF; Posner went with him and taught Physical Theatre at the Juilliard School in New York, and at Brandeis University in Boston. During her nine years in the United States she trained as an actor with Uta Hagen, and she gained an MA in Theatre Arts at Hunter College in 1980. On returning to London she taught Physical Theatre at the London Academy of Music and Dramatic Art, the Royal Academy of Dramatic Art, and the Central School of Speech and Drama.

== Career ==
Later Posner concentrated on an acting career and on television she appeared in Making News (1990), Love Hurts (1994), The Ruth Rendell Mysteries (1995), Bramwell (1997), To Anyone Who Can Hear Me (1999), Casualty (1987–2003), The Bill (2003), Coming Up for Air (2003), Timeless (2005), Apparitions (2008) and The Pharmacist (2012). In 2013, she was one of the main cast members in series 1 of Count Arthur Strong.

Posner's film appearances included Leon the Pig Farmer (1992), Do I Love You? (2002), The Football Factory (2004) and Shemira (2017) . Stage roles include Hiawatha at the Bristol Old Vic (1991–92), The Dybbuk for the Royal Shakespeare Company (1992), The Tempest with the Actors Touring Company (1999), Woman in the Moon at the Arcola Theatre (2001), Ritual in Blood at the Nottingham Playhouse (2001) and Seven Jewish Children (2009) at the Royal Court Theatre.

Posner spoke Polish, German, English, Italian and Hebrew.

Posner's agent was Roger Carey.

== Personal life and death ==
Posner worked at the London Contemporary Dance Company for 17 years, where she eventually met her husband Michael. The couple had one son, who died aged 37. She and her husband lived in England for more than 25 years.

Posner received the British Empire Medal (BEM) in the 2022 New Year Honours for services to Holocaust education and awareness.

Posner and her husband both died by assisted suicide at a clinic in Switzerland, on 23 September 2025. She was 96.

== Published works ==
Posner always wanted to be a dancer and danced most of her life. She felt life through her dancing. During her 40s she decided to switch from dance to drama. Many people told her she wasn't going to "make it" in the theatre world because of her thick accent. Posner proved people wrong and became a popular actress. She appeared in a Holocaust play about her life called Who Do We Think We Are? Along with drama and dancing she also wrote her autobiography, Bits and Pieces of My Life. The book mainly shares many descriptions of her Holocaust experiences and her life afterwards.
