= John Lennard (disambiguation) =

John Lennard is an academic and writer.

John Lennard may also refer to:

- John Lennard of the Lennard Baronets

== See also ==
- Jack Lennard, soccer player
- John Lennard-Jones, mathematician
- John Leonard (disambiguation)
