= John Leonard =

John, Johnny, or Jack Leonard may refer to:

== Arts and entertainment ==
- John Leonard (songwriter) (fl. 1800s–1810s), English poet and songwriter
- Jack E. Leonard (1910–1973), American comedian and actor
- John Leonard (critic) (1939–2008), American literary and film critic
- John Leonard (poet) (born 1965), Australian poet

== Law and politics ==
- John E. Leonard (1845–1878), American politician from Louisiana
- John Leonard, Baron Leonard (1909–1983), British politician
- John Leonard (judge) (1926–2002), British judge

== Sports ==
- Jack Leonard (hurler) (1873–1938), Irish hurler
- Jack Leonard (footballer) (1876–?), English footballer
- Johnny Leonard (1903–1995), Australian rules footballer
- John Leonard (canoeist) (born 1948), New Zealand sprint canoeist
- John Leonard (Gaelic footballer) (born 1976), Irish Gaelic footballer
- John Leonard (ice hockey) (born 1998), American ice hockey player

== Others ==
- John Leonard (bishop) (1829–1908), Irish bishop
- John Leonard (architect) (1857–1932), English architect
- John B. Leonard (1864–1945), American civil engineer
- John W. Leonard (1890–1974), US Army general
- J. Paul Leonard (1901–1995), American academic
- John J. Leonard, American roboticist

== See also ==
- John Leonardi (1541–1609), Roman Catholic saint
- John Lennard (disambiguation)
