= Barnfield Theatre =

Coordinates: 50°43′22.6″N 3°31′32.8″W

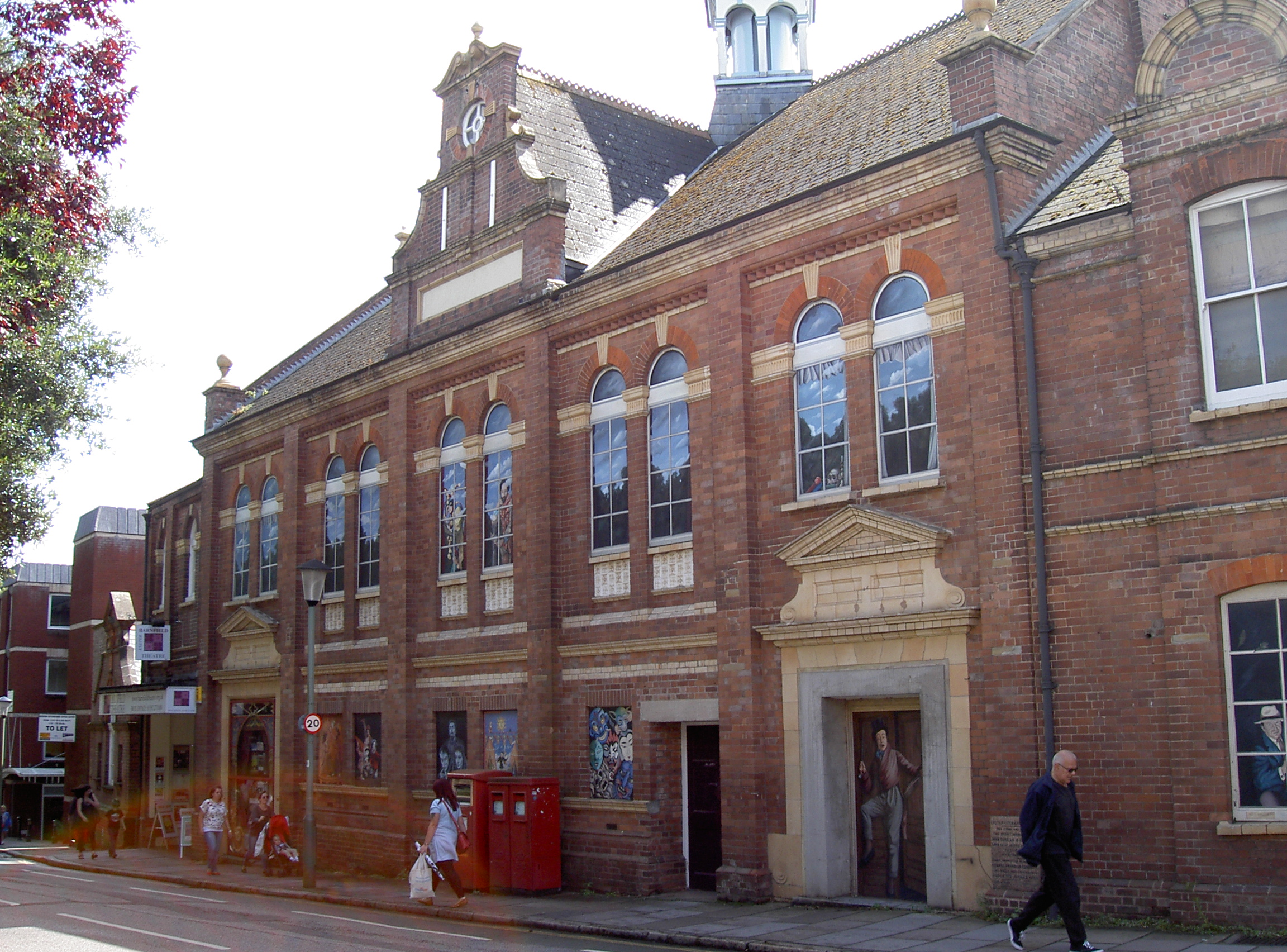
Barnfield Theatre (Pre-2022)

The Barnfield Theatre is a theatre in Exeter, England, located near the centre of the city on Barnfield Road, Southernhay. It was originally built as the Barnfield Hall near the end of the 19th century by Exeter Literary Society, and was converted to a theatre in 1972.

Today the theatre is operated as a charity and is used as a venue for amateur and professional theatrical companies. The building is owned by Exeter City Council and was leased to Barnfield Theatre Limited, who ran the theatre until December 2021, when its management was taken over by the Northcott Theatre.

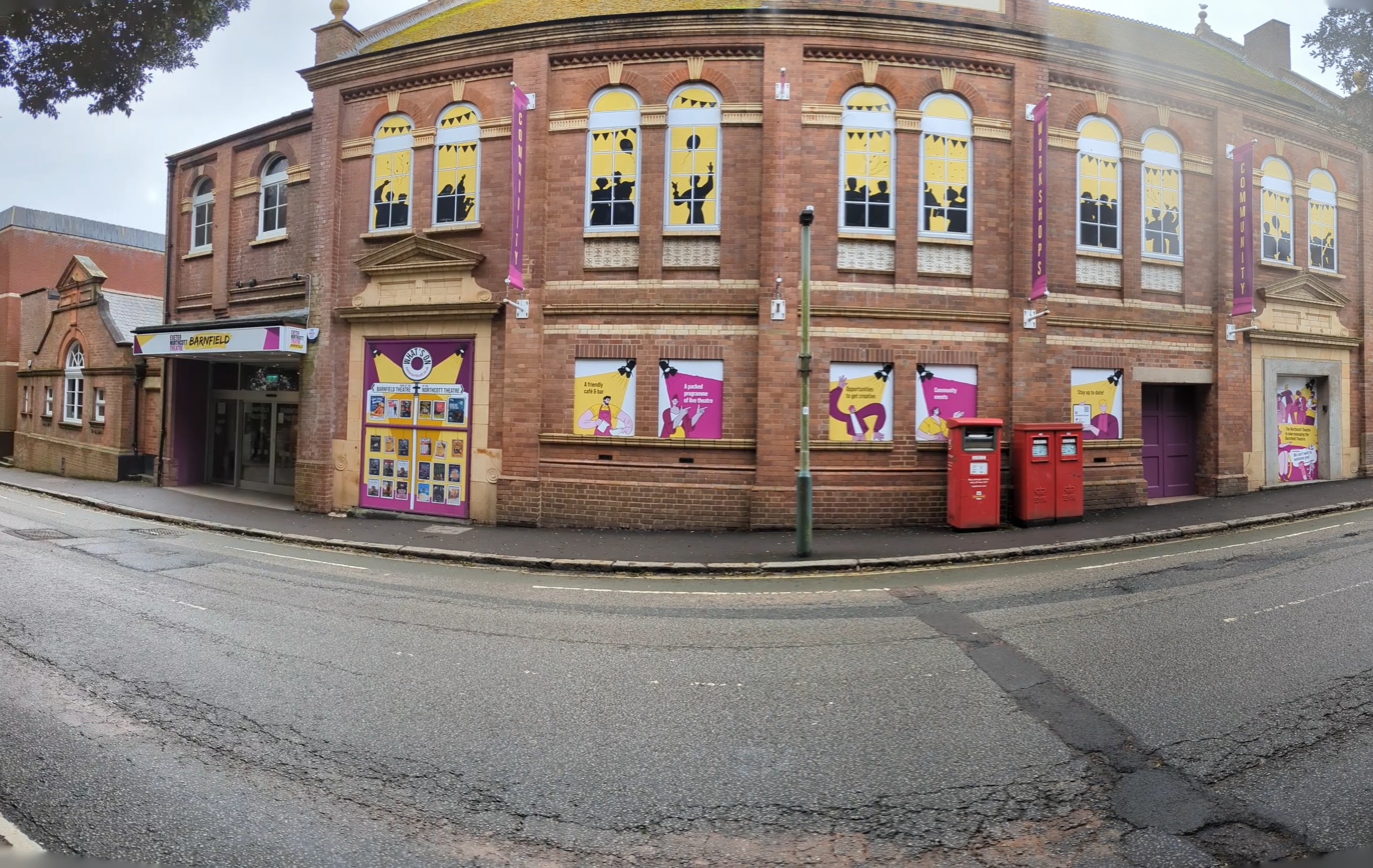
Barnfield Theatre (2025)

== Facilities ==
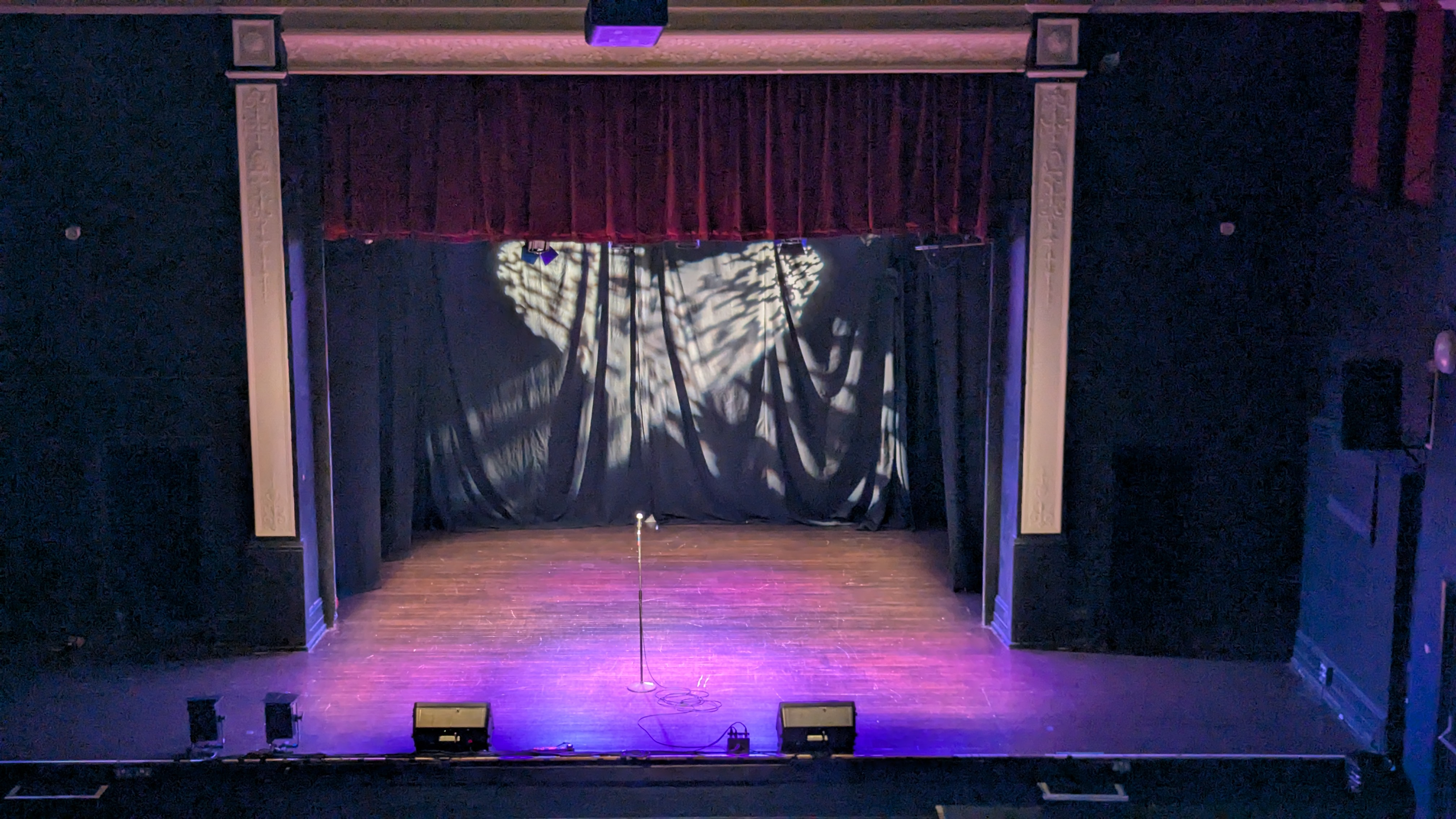
Main Auditorium Stage (2025)

The main auditorium is fully furnished with stage and limited lighting equipment, and has 280 tip-up seats which were reupholstered in 2005 and are in full rake for complete view of the stage from all parts of the seating. It is suitable for conferences, lectures and displays as well as stage productions.

The Clifford Room can be used for many purposes, such as a studio theatre or a conference room. The seating is modular and can be raked, and can be arranged for any theatrical requirements (e.g. theatre in the round, traverse, etc.). It was renamed as the Clifford Room after Clifford Scott in 2007, having previously been the Bedford Room. The room can accommodate up to 60 people seated.

The main foyer to the theatre was lightly updated in 2015 and again in 2022 while under new management from the Exeter Northcott Theatre.

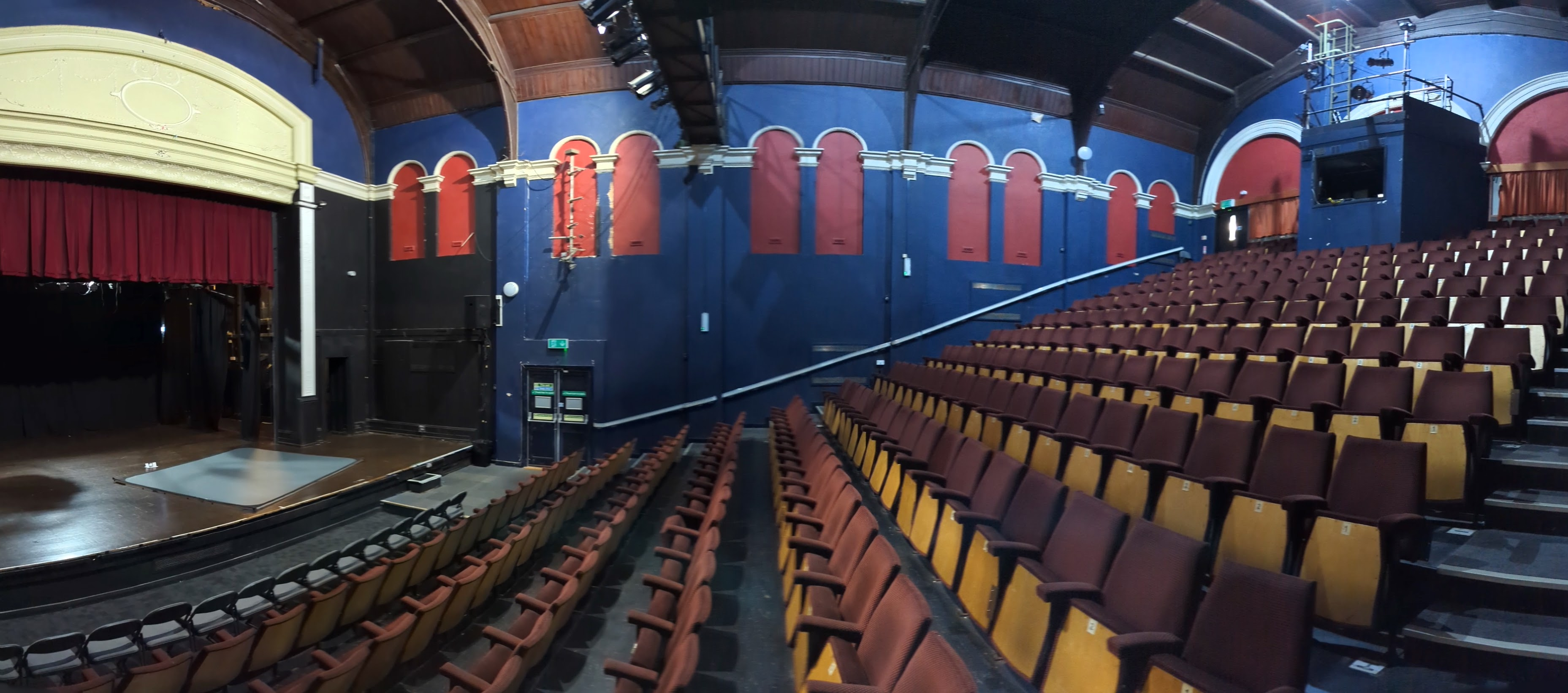
Main Auditorium Seating Bank (2025)
