= Browne Jacobson =

British law firm

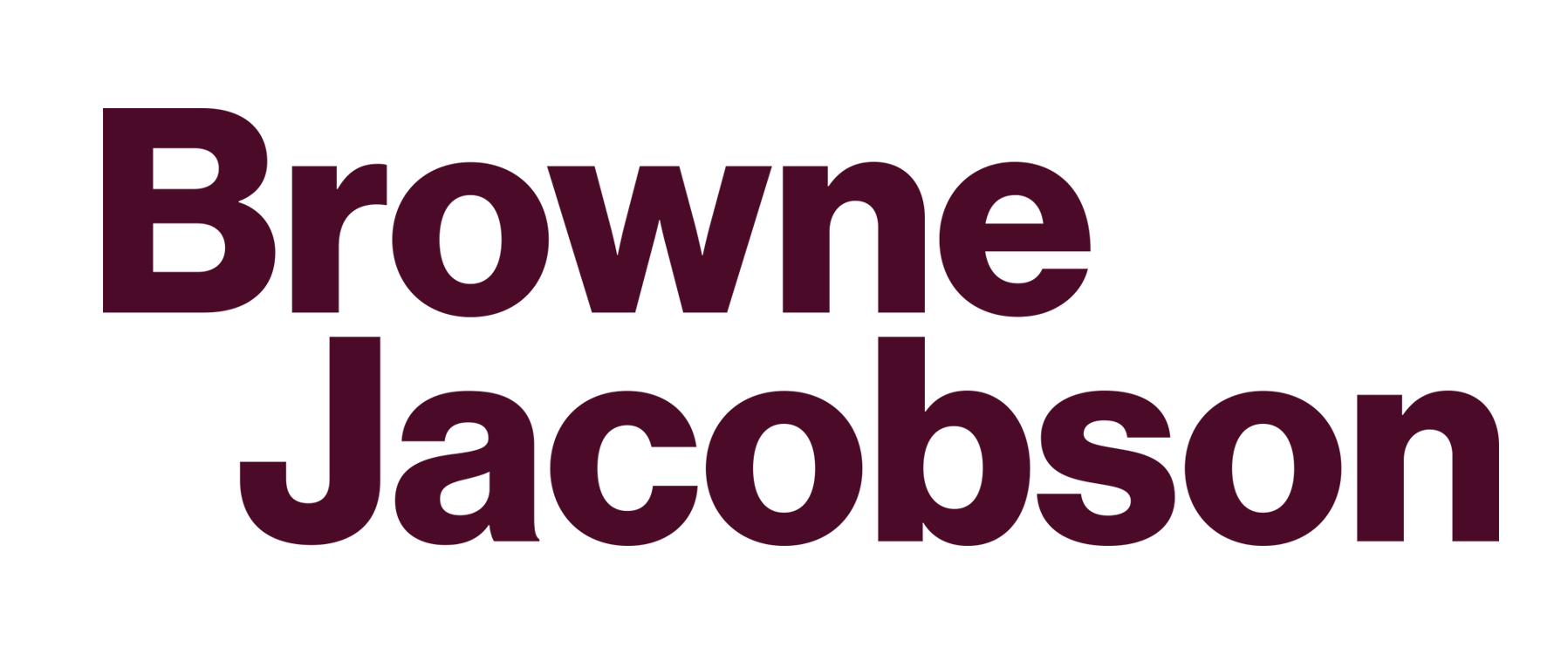
- Headquarters: Nottingham
- No. of offices: 8 in the United Kingdom and Ireland
- No. of lawyers: 800+
- Major practice areas: Full service commercial
- Revenue: ▲£137 million
- Date founded: 1832 (Nottingham)
- Company type: Limited liability partnership
- Website: www.brownejacobson.com

Browne Jacobson LLP is a UK & Ireland law firm with offices in Belfast, Birmingham, Cardiff, Dublin, Exeter, London, Manchester, and Nottingham. It offers services across a number of key UK and international markets: corporates, education, government, health, financial services & insurance. It has over 1400 employees, with over 800 lawyers of which over 150 are partners. The firm works with regional, national and international clients in the public, private and voluntary sectors.

For 2024-25, the firm announced a record annualised turnover of £137m, which reflects year-on-year growth of 16 per cent.

For 2025-26, the firm reported record revenue of £148.8m, up 9% on the previous 12 months. The year also saw Browne Jacobson strengthen its reputation as one of the UK's leading and most innovating law firms. The firm achieved its strongest-ever performance in Chambers and Legal 500 rankings, winning Law Firm of the Year at the Chambers and Partners awards. The firm was also ranked number one overall in the Social Mobility Foundation's Employer Index 2025 for the fourth time in five years.

== Operations ==
Browne Jacobson has eight offices: Belfast, Birmingham, Cardiff, Dublin, Exeter, London, Manchester, and Nottingham.

Browne Jacobson opened its eighth office in Belfast by joining forces with commercial law firm Davidson McDonnell in May 2026.

== History ==
Browne Jacobson was founded in 1832. Its founding partner, Michael Browne, was the then Coroner of Nottingham. Browne & Son, as it was known, was based in Church Gate, Nottingham, and has been in continuous business from this date.

In the early 1900s, the then sole principal of the practice, Arthur Browne, took into partnership Montagu Williams. The firm changed its name to Browne Son & Williams accordingly. Bill Jacobson joined the firm as an Assistant Solicitor, and shortly after, Arthur Browne retired. Williams and Jacobson joined the war effort in 1914, however Williams was killed in action. Jacobson returned to the firm eventually becoming a partner. On his appointment, the firm was renamed Browne Son & Jacobson.

In 1931, the firm Robert Hallam, led by principal Jack Hallam, amalgamated with Browne Son & Jacobson, to become Browne Jacobson & Hallam. The practice moved from its Church Gate base to 44 Friar Lane. Browne Jacobson & Hallam employed Norman Roose in 1932. Roose joined as a young assistant solicitor with a bent for litigation – he became a partner by 1938 creating a three strong partnership; Jacobson, Hallam & Roose. Hallam subsequently left to set up his own practice J. Hallam and Sons at Wheeler Gate, Nottingham in 1954. The firm reflected this change, renaming itself Browne Jacobson & Roose.

Norman Roose retired from the firm as senior partner in the early 1980s and, when the firm moved to the Nottingham premises at Castle Gate in 1987, the name of the firm was changed to Browne Jacobson. Browne Jacobson's London office opened in 1994. There are now more than 70 members of staff, including 22 partners, based in London full-time.

Browne Jacobson's Birmingham office opened in July 1999. Growth in the past couple of years has seen the office double in size with a headcount of over 140 including 29 partners. On 1 May 2004 the firm converted to a limited liability partnership and is now known as Browne Jacobson LLP.

Browne Jacobson's Manchester office opened in January 2012. In July 2012 the firm re-located its Nottingham headquarters to Mowbray House, the award-winning 60,000 sq ft Grade A building which is part of the HM Revenue and Customs headquarters complex designed by Sir Michael Hopkins in the 1990s.

In August 2012 the firm opened its fifth office at 1 Manor Court in the heart of Exeter city centre. In September 2014 the firm announced that it was re-locating its London office to 6 Bevis Marks. In October 2016 the firm announced the moving of its Manchester office to No.1 Spinningfields. In May 2019 the firm moved its Exeter office to The Mount, 72 Paris Street.

In March 2022 the firm announced the relocation of its Birmingham office to 103 Colmore Row. In July 2022 the firm announced its first overseas office in Dublin. In May 2023 the firm relocated its Exeter office to Keble House, Southernhay Gardens. In July 2023 the firm announced the opening of its Cardiff office - its first in Wales - which moved to its more permanent home at One Central Square in February 2026.
