= Komedia =

Arts company in the United Kingdom

Coordinates: 51°22′53″N 2°21′44″W

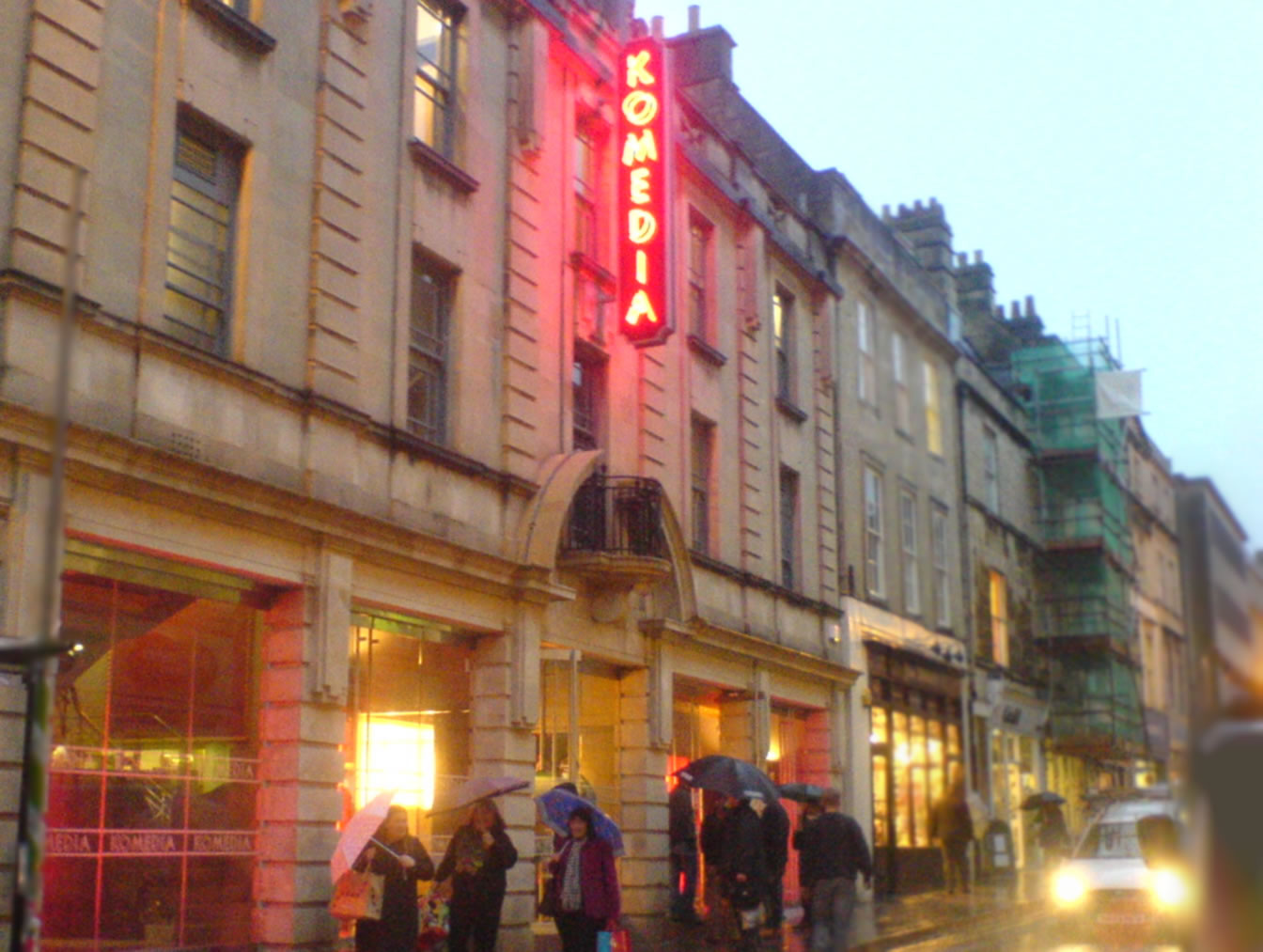
- Komedia Bath on its opening night
- Formation: 1994
- Purpose: Arts and entertainment
- Location: Bath and Brighton
- Website: Venue website

Komedia is an arts and entertainment company which operates venues in the United Kingdom at Brighton and Bath, and a management and production company Komedia Entertainment. Beyond hosting live comedy, the venues also host music, cabaret, theatre and shows for children, featuring local, national and international performers. The Brighton and Bath venues operate cinemas within their buildings in partnership with Picturehouse. Komedia also creates broadcast comedy and has most notably co-produced and hosted the live recordings of seven series of the Sony Award-winning Count Arthur Strong's Radio Show! for BBC Radio 4 and is a co-producer on BBC1's sitcom Count Arthur Strong.

== Programme ==
As well as its resident shows, the Krater Comedy Club, Ministry of Burlesque, and Bent Double, Komedia has a local, national, and international programme, spanning a range of entertainment that includes theatre, music, cabaret, comedy, and live literature.

== History ==
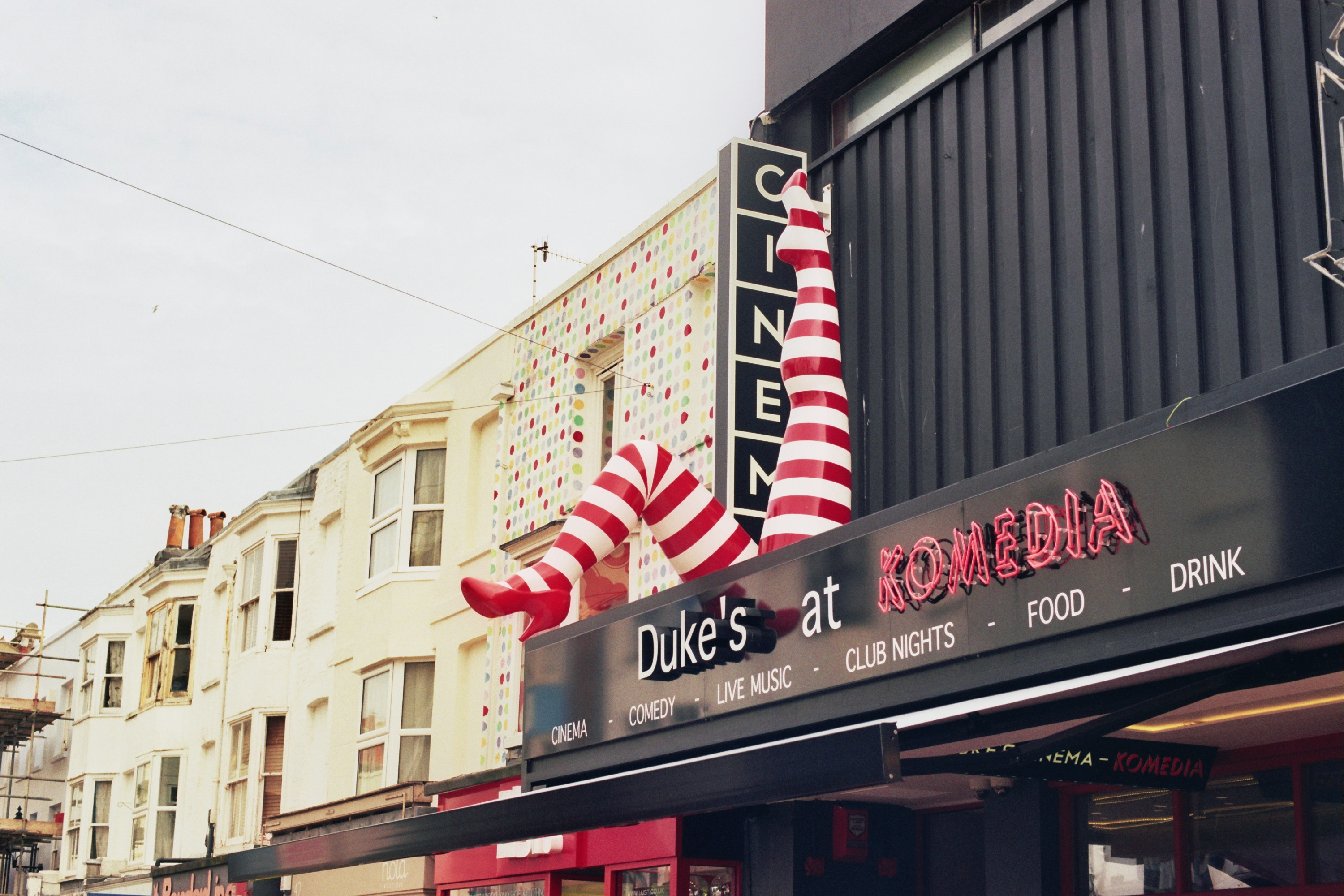
Komedia Brighton, home of Dukes

Komedia is owned by Colin Granger, Marina Kobler and Richard Daws. It was formed in 1994 by Colin Granger, Marina Kobler and David Lavender, beginning as a theatre and cabaret bar in a converted Grade II-listed former billiard hall in Brighton's Kemptown area. Richard Daws became involved in 2001 when he partnered with the venue to form Komedia Entertainment, a management and production company set up after the sale of his production company Victoria Real to Endemol UK. The Komedia logo was designed by Nick Williams of the Matt Black design partnership.

In the early days, Komedia promoted many young performers including Graham Norton, Mel & Sue, Johnny Vegas, Jack Dee, Al Murray, Jenny Eclair, Tim Vine, Sacha Baron Cohen, Ricky Tomlinson, Rhona Cameron and The League of Gentlemen. In 1998 the company moved into a former Tesco supermarket on Gardner Street in the North Laine area of Brighton.

On its relocation in 2000, the Brighton Komedia grew to include three spaces: Komedia Upstairs, Komedia Downstairs, and the Studio Bar, as well as a street-front café and box office on Gardner Street.

== The Dukes of Brighton ==
In December 2012, Dukes at Komedia (sometimes styled as Dukes@Komedia) opened a two-screen cinema operated in collaboration with the Duke of York's cinema and Picturehouse Cinemas. Duke’s at Komedia replaced the original Komedia Upstairs comedy club. The main screen has 142 seats, and a smaller, second screen can seat 96 people. There are two bars, serving snacks and a variety of alcoholic and non-alcoholic drinks, as well as hot food which can be taken into the theatre.

Dukes at Komedia was opened as a sister cinema to Brighton's Duke of York's Picture House, from which the name was taken, enabling a wider variety of film programming in the city. As such, the two venues enjoy a close relationship, sharing many of the same staff. This link is represented visually by the red and white striped can-can legs which can be seen on the Dukes of Komedia's marquee and which resemble the more famous black and white version mounted on the roof of the Duke of York's.

The cinema frequently stages late-night repertory screenings, live filmmaker Q&As and a regular programme of alternative content, including live broadcasts from the Metropolitan Opera, National Theatre and Glyndebourne Festival. The venue has also been hired out as the venue for wedding ceremonies.

=== Brighton Festival ===
Komedia has a presence in the Brighton Festival Fringe every year. In 2007 it won "Best Venue at the Latest Festival Awards" in the Brighton Festival and Fringe.

== Bath ==
In June 2008 Komedia was awarded the lease of the Beau Nash Picture House in Bath, a Grade I-listed neo-classical cinema previously operated by Odeon and known as the Beau Nash Picture House. Following extensive refurbishment, the cinema was transformed into an auditorium and live arts venue designed by architects Stubbs Rich, who have since been awarded The National Constructing Excellence Award for the Heritage Project of the Year for the scheme. The development project won The Building Excellence Award for The Best Renovation of a Listed Building in the UK. The venue opened to the public on 13 November.

Komedia Bath has become an important element of the arts quarter in Bath and presents a programme focused on comedy, music, film, cabaret, spoken word and kids events. The programme includes the Krater Comedy Club, Ministry of Burlesque’s High Tease, and cinema screenings in partnership with The Little Cinema Theatre and Picturehouse.

The venue has a 615 standing capacity and a 456 cabaret seated capacity which includes a balcony seating 168 people. Komedia Bath operates a daytime arts café, which includes a studio venue, displays local artists' work and is host to Affordable Arts Fairs. In 2010, 2012, 2013 and 2015 Komedia Bath won The Chortle Award for Best Venue in the Wales and the West of England.

== Edinburgh Festival ==
Komedia has on occasion simultaneously operated up to three distinct venues at the Edinburgh Festival Fringe. These are loosely split into a comedy venue, a drama venue, and one for theatre companies from around the world that Komedia had helped come to the festival. Komedia has roots in physical theatre, and was a co-founder of the Aurora Nova programme at St. Stephens, which runs during the Edinburgh Festival Fringe.

== Komedia Entertainment ==
Komedia operates a management and production arm which represents emerging and established talent. Komedia Entertainment has produced live shows, radio series and TV projects. These included Japanese Comedy duo Gamarjobat’s Edinburgh shows and their first run on Broadway, New York; the Fringe First winning Meeting Joe Strummer and Count Arthur Strong's Radio Show!, which has completed seven series for BBC Radio 4. Together with national and international tours, the company also produces comedy and music CD & DVD releases and other broadcast projects for the BBC including BBC1's comedy Count Arthur Strong, co-produced with Retort TV and Delightful Industries.
