= List of documentary film festivals =

Documentary film festivals are film festivals devoted solely to documentary film, which is a broad category of visual expression that is based on the attempt, in one fashion or another, to "document" reality.

Although "documentary film" originally referred to movies shot on film stock, it has subsequently expanded to include video and digital productions that can be either direct-to-video or made for a television series. Documentary, as it applies here, works to identify a "filmmaking practice, a cinematic tradition, and mode of audience reception" that is continually evolving and is without clear boundaries.

In many cities around the world, documentary film festivals are held annually to showcase documentaries made that year. Many of them are theme or genre specific.

Name	Est.	City	Country
10 Under 10 Film Festival	2002	Austin	United States
Academia Film Olomouc	1966	Olomouc	Czech Republic
AFI Docs	2003	Washington, D.C.	United States
Al Jazeera Balkans Documentary Film Festival	2018	Sarajevo	Bosnia and Herzegovina
Ambulante Documentary Film Festival	2006	Mexico City	Mexico
Atlanta DocuFest	2005	Atlanta	United States
Belleville Downtown DocFest	2010	Belleville	Canada
Berlin Documentary Forum	2010	Berlin	Germany
Big Sky Documentary Film Festival	2003	Missoula	United States
Camden International Film Festival	2005	Camden	United States
Chagrin Documentary Film Festival	2010	Chagrin Falls	United States
Chicago International Documentary Festival	2003	Chicago	United States
China Screen	2007	Paris	France
Cine Pobre Film Festival	2002	La Paz	Mexico
Cinéma du Réel	1978	Paris	France
Copenhagen International Documentary Festival - CPH:DOX	2003	Copenhagen	Denmark
Development Film Festival	2005	Chennai	India
DMZ International Documentary Film Festival	2009	Gyeonggi Province	South Korea
Doc LA - Los Angeles Documentary Film Festival	2010	Los Angeles	United States
Doc NYC	2010	New York City	United States
Docaviv International Film Festival	1998	Tel Aviv	Israel
Dockanema	2006	Maputo	Mozambique
Doclisboa	2003	Lisbon	Portugal
Documentary Edge Festival	2005	Auckland and Wellington	New Zealand
Docville	2005	Leuven	Belgium
Dok Leipzig	1955	Leipzig	Germany
Dokufest	2001	Prizren	Kosovo
DORF	2007	Vinkovci	Croatia
Dox Box	2008	Damascus	Syria
DOXA Documentary Film Festival	1998	Vancouver	Canada
EBS International Documentary Festival	2004	Seoul	South Korea
Encounters Festival South Africa	1999	Cape Town and Johannesburg	South Africa
Encuentros del Otro Cine EDOC	2002	Quito, Guayaquil, Cuenca, Manta, Ibarra, and Portoviejo	Ecuador
Flashpoint Human Rights Film Festival	2010	Mumbai	India
Folkestone Documentary Festival	2021	Folkestone	(United Kingdom) UK
Freedom Film Fest	2003	Malaysia	Malaysia
Full Frame Documentary Film Festival	1998	Durham	United States
Gimme Some Truth Documentary Festival	2008	Winnipeg	Canada
Gran Paradiso Film Festival	1984	Cogne	Italy
Guangzhou International Documentary Film Festival	2003	Guangdong	China
Guelph Film Festival	1984	Guelph	Canada
Hádoc	2012	Leiria	Portugal
Hot Docs Canadian International Documentary Festival	1993	Toronto	Canada
Hot Springs Documentary Film Festival	1992	Hot Springs	United States
Imagine International Film Festival	2004	Clearwater	United States
International Documentary Film Festival Amsterdam	1988	Amsterdam	Netherlands
International Wildlife Film Festival	1977	Missoula	United States
Io Isabella International Film Week	2005		Italy
Jeevika: Asia Livelihood Documentary Festival	2003	New Delhi	India
Jihlava International Documentary Film Festival	1997	Jihlava	Czech Republic
Junction North International Documentary Film Festival	2013	Sudbury	Canada
Krakow Film Festival	1961	Kraków	Poland
London International Documentary Festival	2007	London	United Kingdom
Marda Loop Justice Film Festival	2006	Calgary	Canada
Margaret Mead Film Festival	1977	New York City	United States
Marseille Festival of Documentary Film	1989	Marseille	France
Millennium Docs Against Gravity	2004	Warsaw	Poland
Montreal International Documentary Festival	1998	Montreal	Canada
New Haven Documentary Film Festival	2014	New Haven	United States
New Media Film Festival	2009	Los Angeles	United States
New Orleans Film Festival	1989	New Orleans	United States
Northwestfest	1983	Edmonton	Canada
Open City Documentary Festival	2011	London	United Kingdom
One World Film Festival	1999	Prague	Czech Republic
Portland Documentary and Experimental Film Festival	2001	Portland	United States
Portland Film Festival	2013	Portland	United States
Pravo Ljudski Film Festival	2006	Sarajevo	Bosnia and Herzegovina
Punto de Vista. International Documentary Film Festival of Navarra	2005	Pamplona	Spain
Sheffield DocFest	1994	Sheffield	United Kingdom
San Francisco Documentary Festival	2001	San Francisco	United States
DOCUTAH International Documentary Film Festival	2010	Utah	United States
Taiwan International Documentary Festival	1998	Taipei	Taiwan
Telluride Mountainfilm	1979	Telluride	United States
Thessaloniki Documentary Festival	1999	Thessaloniki	Greece
True/False Film Festival	2004	Columbia	United States
United Nations Association Film Festival	1998	Palo Alto	United States
ViBGYOR International Film Festival	2006	Thrissur	India
Visions du réel	1969	Nyon	Switzerland
VIVA Film Festival	2015	Sarajevo	Bosnia and Herzegovina
Wakefield Documentary Film Festival	2005	Wakefield	Canada
World Community Film Festival	1990	Courtenay, Duncan, Kelowna and Nanaimo	Canada
Yamagata International Documentary Film Festival	1989	Yamagata	Japan
Yogyakarta Documentary Film Festival	2002	Yogyakarta	Indonesia
ZagrebDox	2005	Zagreb	Croatia

== See also ==
- List of film festivals
