= John Badalu =

Indonesian film producer (1971–2025)

- Born: 1971; Makassar, South Sulawesi, Indonesia
- Died: 21 May 2025 (aged 53–54); Bali, Indonesia
- Occupations: Film producer; film publicist; film programmer
- Years active: 2000–2025

John Badalu (1971 – 21 May 2025) was an Indonesian film producer, publicist, and programmer. He was known for producing films that highlighted LGBTQ+ stories and other minority communities in Southeast Asia. He founded the Q! Film Festival, a LGBTQ+ film festival held in Jakarta, which ran from 2002 to 2017.

== Career ==
In 2000, he worked with British Council and Goethe-Institut to coordinate cultural film festivals and became a freelance journalist and film critic. He founded the Q-Munity in 2001, an organization that began as a group of ethnic Chinese Indonesians interested in contemporary Chinese cinema. A year later, the organization initially aimed to launch a festival of Chinese films. They eventually staged the Q! Film Festival, a festival featuring films that dealt with issues of sexuality, where he served as festival director. The festival ran for fifteen years, ending with its disbandment in 2017.

In 2006, he served as a jury for the Teddy Award, an award presented at the 56th Berlin International Film Festival. He was awarded the Ashoka Fellowship in 2008 in recognition of his advocacy for LGBTQ+ communities through film. Throughout the 2000s and 2010s, he served as a festival delegate at several film festivals, including Berlin International Film Festival, Shanghai International Film Festival, Tallinn Black Nights Film Festival, and Bucheon International Fantastic Film Festival, scouting Southeast Asian films.

In 2012, he produced Paul Agusta's queer drama film Parts of the Heart, which premiered at the International Film Festival Rotterdam. In 2013, he co-produced Mouly Surya's What They Don't Talk About When They Talk About Love. The film had its world premiere at the 2013 Sundance Film Festival. He served as a jury of BIFF Mecenat Award at the 18th Busan International Film Festival. In 2014, he served as an associate producer of Lucky Kuswandi's directorial debut film In the Absence of the Sun, which had its world premiere at the 27th Tokyo International Film Festival.

In 2017, he produced Thai romantic drama film, Malila: The Farewell Flower by Anucha Boonyawatana, which won the Kim Jiseok Award at the 22nd Busan International Film Festival. In 2023, he produced Khozy Rizal's short film, Basri & Salma in a Never-Ending Comedy, being the first Indonesian short film to compete for the Short Film Palme d'Or at the Cannes Film Festival. At the 2024 Indonesian Film Festival, he won two Citra Awards for producing Under the Moonlight and My Therapist Said, I Am Full of Sadness, which won the Best Documentary Feature and Best Documentary Short Film, respectively.

He died at his home in Bali, Indonesia, on 21 May 2025.

== Filmography ==
Badalu was a producer in all films unless otherwise noted.

Feature films

| Year | Film | Director | Credit |
|---|---|---|---|
| 2012 | Parts of the Heart | Paul Agusta | |
| 2013 | What They Don't Talk About When They Talk About Love | Mouly Surya | As co-producer |
| 2014 | In the Absence of the Sun | Lucky Kuswandi | As associate producer |
| 2017 | Malila: The Farewell Flower | Anucha Boonyawatana | |
| 2018 | Ave Maryam | Ertanto Robby Soediskam | As associate producer |
| 2019 | Soil Without Land | Nontawat Numbenchapol | As co-producer |
| 2020 | Everyday Is a Lullaby | Putrama Tuta | |
| 2023 | Under the Moonlight | Tonny Trimarsanto | |
| 2023 | One Big Sumba Family | Tonny Trimarsanto | |
| 2025 | Planet of Love | Ika Wulandari | |

Short films

| Year | Film | Director | Credit |
|---|---|---|---|
| 2015 | Rumah | Yosep Anggi Noen | As associate producer |
| 2015 | Heaven Is Not a Place | Adriyanto Dewo | |
| 2021 | The Men Who Wait | Minh Quý Trương | As co-producer |
| 2021 | Makassar Is a City for Football Fans | Khozy Rizal | |
| 2023 | Basri & Salma in a Never-Ending Comedy | Khozy Rizal | |
| 2023 | Where the Wild Frangipanis Grow | Nirartha Bas Diwangkara | |
| 2024 | Lua | Chi Mai | As co-producer |
| 2024 | My Therapist Said, I am Full of Sadness | Monica Vanesa Tedja | |
