= Notre Dame Fighting Irish =

American athletic program of the University of Notre Dame

- University: University of Notre Dame
- Nickname: Fighting Irish
- NCAA: Division I (FBS)
- Conference: Atlantic Coast Conference (primary); Big Ten (men's ice hockey); Independent (football)
- Athletic director: Pete Bevacqua
- Location: Notre Dame, Indiana
- Varsity teams: 26
- Football stadium: Notre Dame Stadium
- Basketball arena: Edmund P. Joyce Center
- Baseball stadium: Frank Eck Stadium
- Softball stadium: Melissa Cook Stadium
- Soccer stadium: Alumni Stadium
- Other venues: List: Arlotta Family Lacrosse Stadium Castellan Family Fencing Center Compton Family Ice Arena Courtney Tennis Center Eck Tennis Pavilion Loftus Sports Center McConnell Family Boathouse Notre Dame Golf Course Notre Dame Track and Field Stadium Rolfs Aquatic Center Warren Golf Course
- Colors: Blue and gold
- Mascot: Leprechaun
- Fight song: Notre Dame Victory March
- Website: fightingirish.com

Atlantic Coast Conference logo in Notre Dame's colors

The Notre Dame Fighting Irish are the athletic teams that represent the University of Notre Dame. The Fighting Irish participate in 26 National Collegiate Athletic Association (NCAA) Division I intercollegiate sports, with its teams – except for football (FBS Independent) and men's ice hockey (Big Ten) – competing in the Atlantic Coast Conference (ACC). The school colors are gold and blue and the mascot is the Leprechaun. The interscholastic sports program began on November 23, 1887, with football in Notre Dame, Indiana.

== History ==
=== Moniker ===
The exact origin of the moniker "Fighting Irish" is unknown and has been the subject of debates and research. It was first attested to as early as 1909 and became more popular in the 1910s, becoming the official nickname in 1927.

Prior to that, the athletes and teams at Notre Dame were known by many different unofficial names. During the Knute Rockne football era, Notre Dame had several unofficial nicknames, among them the "Rovers", "Domers", and the "Ramblers". These names reflected the teams' propensity to travel the nation to play its football contests, long before such national travel became the collegiate norm. Later, Notre Dame was known unofficially as the "Terriers" after the Irish breed of the dog, and for some years, an Irish Terrier would be found on the ND football sidelines. Other popular names were “the Gold and Blue”, “Nomads,” “the Blue Comets”, and “the Horrible Hibernians”. According to historian Murray Sperber, during the 1910s and 1920s, anti-Catholic and anti-Irish stereotypes and ethnic slurs were openly expressed against immigrants, and the press often referred to Notre Dame teams as "Catholics", "Papists", or "Dirty Irish". University leadership wished to distance itself from such names, and school publications referred to the team "the Gold and Blue" or the "Notre Damers".

"Absolution Under Fire", by Paul Henry Wood, depicting Fr. Corby and the Irish Brigade at the Battle of Gettysburg.

There are several accounts on the origins of "Fighting Irish". One story suggests the moniker was born in 1899 during a game between Notre Dame and Northwestern. The Notre Dame squad was leading 5–0 at halftime when the Wildcat fans began to chant, "Kill the Fighting Irish, kill the Fighting Irish" as the second half opened. The November 9th, 1912 edition of Notre Dame's student magazine Scholastic attributed the moniker "Fighting Irishmen" to the president of the University of Illinois Urbana-Champaign. Another legend in Notre Dame folklore is that the nickname was inherited from Irish immigrant soldiers who fought in the Civil War with the Union's Irish Brigade. Notre Dame's claim to the nickname would seem to come from the presence of Fr. William Corby, CSC, the third president of Notre Dame, who was at the Battle of Gettysburg. Fr. Corby served as chaplain of the Irish Brigade and granted general absolution to the troops in the midst of the battle. This is commemorated in the painting "Absolution Under Fire," part of Notre Dame's permanent art collection. A life-size statue of Fr. Corby stands in front of Corby's namesake building on the Notre Dame campus. A print of the painting "The Original Fighting Irish" by former Notre Dame lacrosse player Revere La Noue is on permanent display at the university's Arlotta Stadium. A print also hung in the office of former head Notre Dame football coach Brian Kelly, who said that he wanted to have the work which captured the "swagger" and "toughness" of the football program after seeing it online.

One of the first documented uses of the nickname comes from the Notre Dame-Michigan game in 1909 when Edward A. Batchelor wrote in the Detroit Free Press: "Eleven fighting Irishmen wrecked the Yost machine this afternoon. These sons of Erin, individually and collectively representing the University of Notre Dame, not only beat the Michigan team, but they dashed some of Michigan's fondest hopes." Notre Dame football historian John Kryk later wrote: "With that flowery lead, E.A. Batchelor of the Detroit Free Press popularized a moniker Notre Dame teams would later come to embrace - and aptly summed up the greatest athletic achievement to that point in Notre Dame history." Kryk noted that according to Notre Dame folklore, Batchelor had overheard a Notre Dame player trying to motivate his teammates at halftime by pleading, "What's the matter with you guys? You're all Irish and you're not fighting worth a lick."

The term Fighting Irish was used in an official capacity by the Notre Dame Football Review as early as 1917 and by Scholastic as early as 1912. While commonly used throughout student and university media at the time, it was still not universally accepted, as evidenced by an alumni letter in Scholastic opposing its use by virtue of the fact that most students did not have an Irish background.

One theory associates the popularity of the nickname to the visit from future president of the Republic of Ireland Éamon de Valera, who had been part of the 1916 Easter Rising and was imprisoned and sentenced to death. He was given amnesty, elected to Parliament, and arrested by the authorities again. He escaped and slipped off to the United States to avoid recapture. Barnstorming the country, the future president of Ireland was welcomed as a hero at Notre Dame on October 15, 1919. Accounts in Scholastic indicate that his visit tilted campus opinion in favor of the "Fighting Irish" moniker — though not completely. De Valera planted a "tree of liberty" as a memorial of his visit — only to have it uprooted a week later and thrown in one of the campus lakes by a student "of Unionist persuasion."

Notre Dame alumnus historian Todd Tucker from the class of 1990 asserts that the moniker became official in large part as a way of honoring and appeasing the student body after a confrontation with the Ku Klux Klan. The Klan had planned a three-day rally to begin on May 17, 1924. In response to racist and anti-immigration sentiments espoused by the Klan, a large number of Notre Dame students arrived in downtown South Bend to interrupt the Klan's parade with violent harassment. A secondary brawl ensued following the weekend's incident. Rev. Matthew Walsh, C.S.C., then the university president, having addressed the immediate threats of continued violence between the Klan and members of the university, was able to calm the students’ ire and restore relative peace.

Francis Wallace, a student press agent for Knute Rockne and sportswriter, tried to popularize the name “Blue Comets” starting in 1923 but soon gave up and admitted his artificial attempt at a lasting name failed. Instead, he helped to popularize the use of “Fighting Irish” in the pages of the New York Post and the New York Daily News.

In 1927, university president Matthew J. Walsh authorized the moniker "The Fighting Irish" as the official nickname. He stated that "The university authorities are in no way averse to the name ‘Fighting Irish’ as applied to our athletic teams. It seems to embody the spirit that we like to see carried into effect by the various organizations that represent us on the athletic field. I sincerely hope that we may always be worthy of the ideal embodied in the term ‘Fighting Irish."

=== Conference affiliations ===
Notre Dame joined the Midwestern City Conference (now known as the Horizon League) for all sports except football, basketball and hockey in 1982. They remained in the conference, with the exception of the 1986–87 season, until 1995. They were then members of the "old" Big East Conference, basketball included, from 1995 until 2013. The Irish are currently a member of the Atlantic Coast Conference (ACC) in all sports except for the following:

- Football, in which the university maintains its status as an independent university. It is a member of the Football Bowl Subdivision, and for postseason purposes Notre Dame is the only independent with the privileges granted to teams in the Power Four conferences.

Because of the COVID-19 pandemic, the 2020 football team played a full ACC schedule with eligibility for the ACC Championship Game for which they qualified.

- The Men's ice hockey team competes in the Big Ten. Their former hockey conference, the Central Collegiate Hockey Association, disbanded after the 2012–13 season due to a major realignment of hockey conferences. The Irish then spent three seasons as a member of Hockey East before joining the Big Ten.

According to former men's basketball coach Mike Brey, Notre Dame strongly considered joining the Big Ten in 2003, with the decision not to proceed occurring at the "11th hour".

== Sports sponsored ==
Men's sports	Women's sports
Baseball	Basketball
Basketball	Cross country
Cross country	Golf
Football	Lacrosse
Golf	Rowing
Ice hockey	Soccer
Lacrosse	Softball
Soccer	Swimming and diving
Swimming and diving	Tennis
Tennis	Track and field^{†}
Track and field^{†}	Volleyball
Co-ed sports
Fencing
† – Track and field includes both indoor and outdoor

=== Football ===
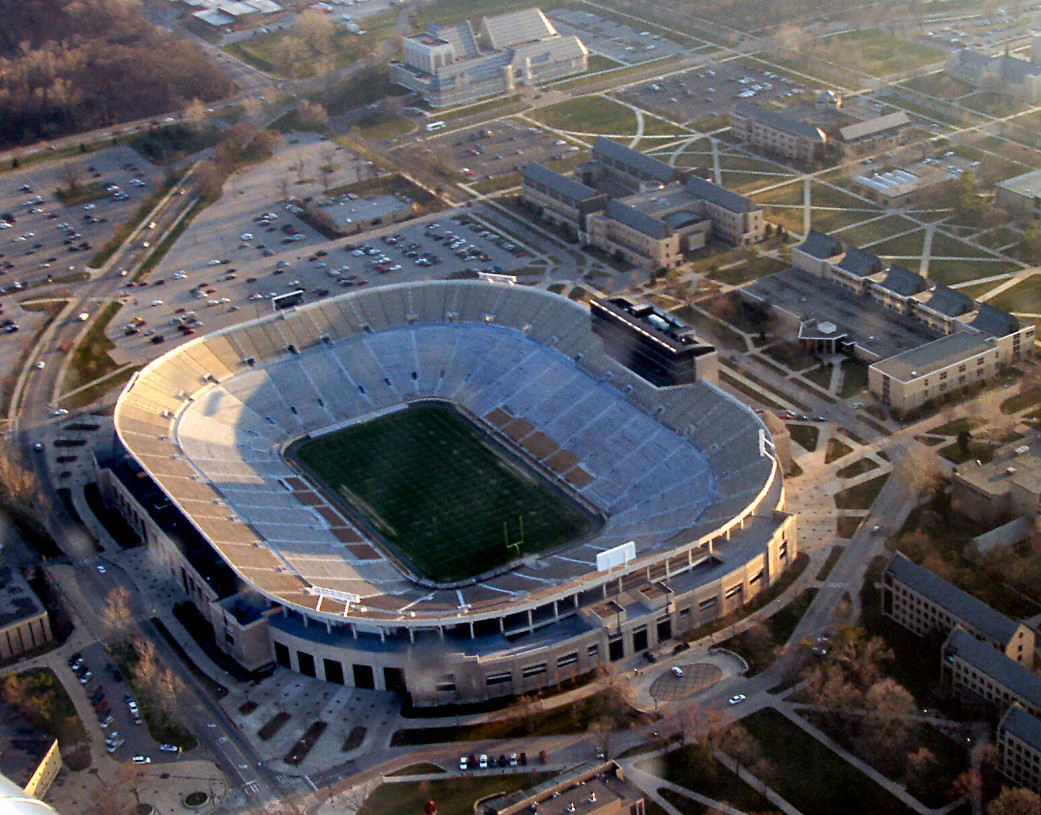
Notre Dame Stadium

The present head coach of the team is Marcus Freeman. The Fighting Irish play in the Notre Dame Stadium and have claimed 11 National Championships (1924, 1929, 1930, 1943, 1946, 1947, 1949, 1966, 1973, 1977, 1988). There are other years (1919, 1920, 1927, 1938, 1953, 1964, 1967, 1970, 1989, 1993, 2012) where various mathematical systems and polls selected Notre Dame as a national champion (some retrospectively), but those years are not claimed by the university.

The school has a comprehensive and nationally competitive Division I athletic program, but it is most famous for its football program. Notre Dame fielded its first football team in 1887. With eleven football championships acknowledged by the NCAA, over 900 all-time wins, seven Heisman Trophy winners, famous head coaches, a 73% winning percentage and the most consensus All-Americans of any school, Notre Dame football is one of the most storied programs both on the gridiron and college athletics in general. Notre Dame is also the only football program in the nation, including both collegiate and professional ones, with every home game being on national broadcast television.

In addition to having the oldest university marching band in the country, the school has many rivalries in football, the most famous ones being with USC, Navy, Michigan State, Army, Purdue, and Michigan. Other Notre Dame rivalries include those with Stanford, Boston College, and Pittsburgh. Former rivalries include a very intense one in the 1980s with Miami (Catholics vs. Convicts), and a rivalry with Penn State, which was renewed and played on September 9, 2006, and again during the 2007 season. The football program is also known for ending the Oklahoma NCAA record winning streak of 47 games. The streak-ending game was a 7–0 victory for the Fighting Irish on November 9, 1957. Incidentally, Oklahoma's 28–21 loss to Notre Dame to open the 1953 season was the last loss before the beginning of the streak.

Notre Dame played in arguably the greatest, although certainly not the most-watched (due to Notre Dame games' already having been broadcast nationally that season as many times as allowed, ABC had to relegate its broadcast to a regional one), college football game in history: the 10–10 tie against Michigan State at Spartan Stadium on November 19, 1966.

Notre Dame's only trip to the BCS National Championship Game was at the end of the 2012 season, where they suffered a 42–14 loss to the Alabama Crimson Tide. The Fighting Irish made the 4-team College Football Playoff twice, in the 2018 and 2020 seasons, failing to make the championship game both times. In the inaugural 12-team playoff after the 2024 season, the Irish defeated the Indiana Hoosiers, Georgia Bulldogs, and Penn State Nittany Lions, earning the right to face the Ohio State Buckeyes in the national championship game.

=== Basketball ===
==== Men's ====
- Head Coach: Micah Shrewsberry
- Arena: Purcell Pavilion at the Joyce Center
- ACC Titles: 2015
- National Championships: 2 (1927*, 1936*)
- Final Fours: 1 (1978)

* Pre-tournament era Helms Trophy

The men's basketball team, coached by Mike Brey since 2000, has made 28 NCAA Tournament appearances and made it to the Final Four in 1978 under coach Digger Phelps. They are also known for ending UCLA's 88-game winning streak in 1974, a streak which had begun after Notre Dame had previously ended UCLA's 45-game winning streak in 1971. Notre Dame won the 2015 ACC Tournament and advanced to the Elite Eight only to fall to top-ranked Kentucky 68–66. The next year they would make another Elite Eight, yet lose to North Carolina.

==== Women's ====
- Head Coach: Niele Ivey
- Arena: Purcell Pavilion at the Joyce Center
- ACC Titles: 6 (2014, 2015, 2016, 2017, 2019, 2024)
- National Championships: 2 (2001, 2018)
- Final Fours: 9 (1997, 2001, 2011, 2012, 2013, 2014, 2015, 2018, 2019)

Notre Dame's women's basketball team is a perennial championship level program which has been consistently ranked in the top 5 in the country for the past 8 years, notching 8 consecutive 30+ win seasons. Former coach Muffet McGraw led the Fighting Irish to 25 NCAA tournament appearances including a streak of 23 straight, winning two national championships and 8 Final Four appearances.

The Irish won their first national championship in 2001 by beating Purdue 68–66. The 2001 team was led by 6-foot-5 center Ruth Riley, a recent inductee into the Women's Basketball Hall of Fame. McGraw would take the Fighting Irish back to the Final Four in 2011, beating Pat Summitt's Tennessee Lady Volunteers; this was the program's first win against the Lady Vols in 21 tries. That win was followed by an upset of the number one-ranked UConn Huskies (making Notre Dame the first team ever to beat both Tennessee and UConn in the same tournament) to advance the Fighting Irish to the 2011 championship game, where it lost to Texas A&M. The Irish would return to the championship game in 2012, 2014, and 2015, losing to Baylor once and Connecticut twice. After an injury plagued start to the 2018 season, which saw four Irish players lost to injury, Notre Dame won its second national championship in 2018 by beating Mississippi State 61–58. Guard Arike Ogunbowale scored the game winning three point shot with 0.1 seconds left, two days after scoring a similar buzzer-beater to knock out Connecticut in the semifinal game. The win was coach McGraw's second national championship and 800th career win.

=== Fencing ===
The Notre Dame men's and women's fencing teams have won 14 national titles — the men's team won titles in 1977, 1978 and 1986 while the women's team won the 1987 title. After the NCAA replaced the individual men's and women's national titles with a combined fencing championship, Notre Dame won national titles in 1994, 2003, 2005, 2011, and most recently, in 2017, 2018, 2021, 2022, 2023, and 2025. During the 2010 regular season, Notre Dame went undefeated in both men's and women's fencing. Notre Dame alumna Mariel Zagunis became the first U.S. fencer to win an Olympic gold medal in 100 years in 2004 and the first U.S. women's fencer to win a gold medal, and Nick Itkin became the first American to win a US championship, NCAA championship, and Junior World championship all in the same year.

=== Ice hockey ===
- Head Coach: Brock Sheahan
- Arena: Compton Family Ice Arena (Formerly at Joyce Center, 1968–2011)
- Conference Titles: (CCHA) 3 (2007, 2009, 2013) (Big Ten) 1 (2018)
- Frozen Four Appearances: 4 (2008, 2011, 2017, 2018)

Notre Dame's men's ice hockey team, coached by Jeff Jackson and captained by T.J. Jindra, won both the Central Collegiate Hockey Association (CCHA) season and tournament championships in 2007 with a record of 28–6–3. They were the #2 overall seed in the 2007 NCAA Men's Hockey Tournament, behind Minnesota, and were the #1 seed in the Midwest bracket. They lost to Michigan State in the second round of the NCAA tournament.

Notre Dame was a #4 seed in the 2008 NCAA Tournament and faced #1 seed New Hampshire. They beat New Hampshire 7–3 and then faced Michigan State, the same team that knocked them out of the tournament the previous year. This time, the Fighting Irish defeated the Spartans 3–1 and earned their first trip in school history to the Frozen Four. In the semi-final they defeated the overall #1 seeded Michigan 5–4 in overtime, earning them their first ever national championship berth against Boston College, in which they were defeated 4–1.

Notre Dame joined the Big Ten conference as sports affiliate member on July 1, 2017. They play along Michigan, Michigan State, Minnesota, Ohio State, Penn State, and Wisconsin in ice hockey.

=== Lacrosse ===
==== Men's ====
- Head Coach: Kevin Corrigan
- Field: Arlotta Stadium, Loftus Sports Center
- Conference Titles (MLA): 8 (1982, 1984, 1986, 1988, 1990, 1992, 1993)
- Conference Titles (GWLL): 12 (1994, 1995, 1996, 1997, 1999, 2000, 2001, 2002, 2003, 2007, 2008, 2009)
- Conference Titles (Big East): 1 (2012)
- Conference Titles (ACC): 6 (regular season: 2015, 2016, 2022, 2024; tournament: 2014, 2018, 2024)
- NCAA Tournament Appearances: 27 (1990, 1992, 1993, 1994, 1995, 1996, 1997, 1999, 2000, 2001, 2006, 2007, 2008, 2009, 2010, 2011, 2012, 2013, 2014, 2015, 2016, 2017, 2018, 2019, 2021, 2023, 2024)
- Final Four Appearances: 7 (2001, 2010, 2012, 2014, 2015, 2023, 2024)
- National Championships: 2 (2023, 2024)

The Notre Dame men's lacrosse team has made the NCAA lacrosse tournament every year since 2006, except 2022, reaching the national semifinals (Final Four) in 2001 and 2010 and the national championship game in 2010 in which it lost to Duke by one goal in overtime, 6–5. In 2009, the Fighting Irish went undefeated in the regular season, reached #2 in national polls, and finished with an overall record of 15–1. In 2014 #5 ranked Notre Dame advanced to the NCAA Championship match only to lose to #1 ranked Duke, 11–9. In 2023 Notre Dame defeated the Blue Devils in the national championship game 13–9 to claim its first national title. In 2024 Notre Dame defeated the Maryland Terrapins in the championship final 15–5 to claim a second national championship.

==== Women's ====
- Head Coach: Christine Halfpenny
- Field: Arlotta Stadium, Loftus Sports Center
- NCAA Tournament Appearances: 13 (2002, 2004, 2006, 2008, 2009, 2010, 2012, 2013, 2014, 2015, 2016, 2017, 2019, 2021)

The Notre Dame women's lacrosse team reached the NCAA semifinal round (Final Four) in 2006. In 2010, they reached the NCAA tournament for the 3rd straight year, the longest streak in school history. The Fighting Irish advanced to the second round of the 2014 NCAA Lacrosse Championship before losing to Duke 10–8.

=== Soccer ===
==== Men's ====
- Head Coach: Chad Riley
- Field: Alumni Stadium
- National Championships: 1 (2013)
- College Cup Appearances: 3 (2013, 2021, 2023)

==== Women's ====
- Head Coach: Nate Norman
- Field: Alumni Stadium
- Conference Titles (MCC)*: 4 (1991, 1992, 1993, 1994)
- Conference Titles (Big East*): 10 (1995, 1996, 1997, 1998, 1999, 2000, 2001, 2005, 2006, 2008)
- National Championships: 3 (1995, 2004, 2010)
- College Cup Appearances: 17 (1993, 1994, 1995, 1996, 1997, 1998, 1999, 2000, 2001, 2002, 2003, 2004, 2005, 2006, 2007, 2008, 2009, 2010)

*Notre Dame was a member of the Midwestern Collegiate Conference and Big East Conference in soccer prior to joining the ACC in most sports.

Notre Dame's women's soccer team won the national championship in 1995, 2004 and 2010 and were the runner-up in 1994, 1996, 1999, 2006, and 2008. Notre Dame is one of only three schools with multiple national titles, the others being North Carolina (21) and Portland (2). Notre Dame also ranks second in all-time title game appearances (8) behind North Carolina (23). ND's women's soccer program started in 1988 under coach Chris Petrucelli. Their 1995 Big East title was the university's first in any sport. That same year, Petrucelli's squad, under the leadership of Cindy Daws, won the program's first national title, defeating Portland 1–0.

Notre Dame's current coach, Randy Waldrum, took over the program in 1999 and has maintained the Fighting Irish's success, winning the national title in 2004 by beating UCLA 4–3 as well as capturing six Big East titles. Waldrum's 2010 squad won the school's third national title, going 21-2-2 and posting 15 shutouts and became the lowest ranked team to do so, beating undefeated Stanford in a 1–0 decision. In doing so, they outscored their postseason opponents 15–1. They also reached the College Cup for the 5th straight year, a school record. Their senior class won 87 matches in their 4 years, the most in that span. Three Notre Dame players have won the Hermann Trophy, given to the United States' best male and female collegiate soccer players. They are Cindy Daws (1996), Anne Mäkinen (2000) and Kerri Hanks (2006, 2008). Hanks is one of only four players to win the award twice. Notre Dame is also one of only two schools with three or more different Hermann Trophy recipients.

=== Men's golf ===
The men's golf team has won 11 conference championships:

- Horizon League (3): 1988–89, 1995
- Big East Conference (8): 1995–97, 2004–06, 2011–12

They won the NCAA Championship in 1944.

== Club sports ==
=== Rugby ===
Founded in 1961, the Notre Dame rugby club was one of the oldest college rugby clubs in the Midwest, before the club was disbanded in 1995. Notre Dame reinstated rugby in 2007, however, due in part to the "explosive growth of rugby in the nation's Catholic high schools" and Notre Dame's desire to offer a program to attract rugby-playing students. Notre Dame began the 2007–08 season in Division 2, but their 8–1–1 record merited a promotion to Division 1 in the spring of 2008.

Notre Dame finished the 2010–11 season ranked 19th in the nation. Notre Dame's rugby program has the support and commitment of the school and alumni, with an endowment fund rumored to be over $1 million. The team is coached by Justin Hickey. Notre Dame also plays every year in the Collegiate Rugby Championship (CRC). The CRC is the highest profile college rugby competition in the United States, broadcast live on NBC each year. Notre Dame finished 10th in the 2011 CRC, with wins over Boston College, Ohio State and Navy.

=== Men's rowing ===
Rowing at Notre Dame began on St. Mary Lake in 1863. Intraschool competition started fewer than 25 years after the school was founded and 25 years before the first football game. In the early 1900s, Knute Rockne rowed for 4 years. He competed in the 6 man boat, representing his academic year against other years.

In 1965, Sports Illustrated profiled the team in an article entitled "Up a Muddy River in a Beat-up Shell". The magazine compared Notre Dame's resources and success to that of Harvard University.

In 1974, the first ever Notre Dame women's sports victory came at rowing's Midwest Sprints. Until 1999, the team was included both women and men. In the same year, women achieved varsity status and have since competed for the NCAA championship.

In 2016, the university dedicated the multi-million dollar McConnell Family boathouse. This gave both teams a facility equipped with locker rooms, meeting rooms, training space, and access to the St. Joseph River.

In 2024, with the support of a multi-million endowment, the team won its first Varsity 8+ title at the ACRA National Championship and have subsequently won multiple gold medals at the ACRA, Head of the Charles, SIRA, and San Diego Crew Classic.

Since 2020, the Varsity 8+'s from Notre Dame and UCLA are the two only programs to earn top 3 finishes every year. Prior to the start of the 2025 season, the team hired Sean McKenna from the University of Texas as head coach for the men's rowing team and Martin Stone for the women's squad.

== Other sports ==
John A. Kromkowski, (BA '60) (MA '61) (Phd '72), won the National Intercollegiate Men's Singles Table Tennis championship in 1959 defeating Paul S. Kochanowski (BA '61) 3–0. Playing together Kromkowski and Kochanowski won the Men's Doubles championship that year and they won the "Teams".

== Athletic facilities ==
- Alumni Stadium — Men's and women's soccer
- Arlotta Family Lacrosse Stadium — Men's and women's lacrosse
- Castellan Family Fencing Center — Men's and women's fencing
- Compton Family Ice Arena — Men's ice hockey
- Courtney Tennis Center — Men's and women's tennis
- Eck Tennis Pavilion — Men's and women's tennis
- Edmund P. Joyce Center — Men's and women's basketball, Women's volleyball
- Frank Eck Stadium — Baseball
- Loftus Sports Center — Men's and women's indoor track and field, Men's and women's lacrosse
- McConnell Family Boathouse — Men's rowing
- Melissa Cook Stadium — Softball
- Notre Dame Golf Course — Men's and women's cross country
- Notre Dame Stadium — Football
- Notre Dame Track and Field Stadium — Men's and women's outdoor track and field
- Rolfs Aquatic Center — Men's and women's swimming and diving
- Warren Golf Course — Men's and women's golf

== Pageantry ==
Team colors: Gold and Blue
Outfitter: Under Armour
Fight Song: Notre Dame Victory March
Alma mater: Notre Dame, Our Mother
Nicknames: Fighting Irish
Rivalries: USC Trojans, Michigan Wolverines, Michigan State Spartans, Stanford Cardinal, & Navy Midshipmen
Mascot: The Leprechaun
Marching Band: The Band of the Fighting Irish

== Athletic directors ==
Athletic director	Years
Jesse Harper	1913–1917, 1931–1933
Knute Rockne	1918–1931
Elmer Layden	1934–1940
Hugh Devore	1945
Frank Leahy	1947–1949
Moose Krause	1949–1981
Gene Corrigan	1981–1987
Dick Rosenthal	1987–1995
Mike Wadsworth	1995–2000
Kevin White	2000–2008
Jack Swarbrick	2008–2024
Pete Bevacqua	2024–present
