= Edoc =

EDOC is an abbreviation for multiple terms:

- Encuentros del Otro Cine, an international documentary film festival held annually in Ecuador
- Enterprise Distributed Object Computing, a standard of the Object Management Group
- Electronic document
