= Belleville Downtown DocFest =

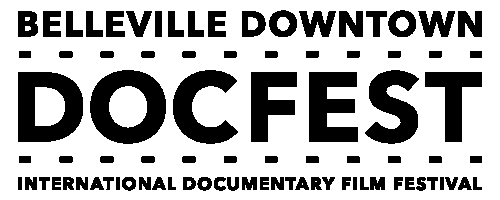
- Location: Belleville, Ontario Canada
- Established: 2011
- Website: https://www.downtowndocfest.ca/

Belleville Downtown DocFest is a documentary film festival held in Belleville, Ontario (Canada) since 2011. The festival seeks to promotes awareness of cultural, economic, and environmental issues and to encourage participation of the community.

== History ==
Belleville Downtown Docfest was cofounded by the creator and producer Gary Magwood, who served as chair for the first six years of the documentary festival. Its roots are in a regular monthly documentary film screening series launched by the Belleville Public Library in 2009, which was then expanded into a full film festival.

For the 2016 edition, the festival held filmmaking workshops and instructors of the Liaison of Independent Filmmakers of Toronto (LIFT). In 2018, a filmmaker panel was held in the festival. The festival featured 60 local and international films and with more than 700 visitors. Magwood said only around 10 per cent of the visitors this year were first time attendees.

In 2021, the festival was held virtually. In its 10th edition, three Academy Award shortlisted docs were projected: The Mole Agent (2020), Collective (2019) and Welcome to Chechnya (2020). Other documentaries available by streaming were The Booksellers (2019), Overland (2019) and Youth Unstoppable (2018).
