= Minikino Film Week =

International Short Film Festival in Bali, Indonesia

Coordinates: 43°38′48″N 79°23′25″W

Minikino Film Week - Bali International Short Film Festival
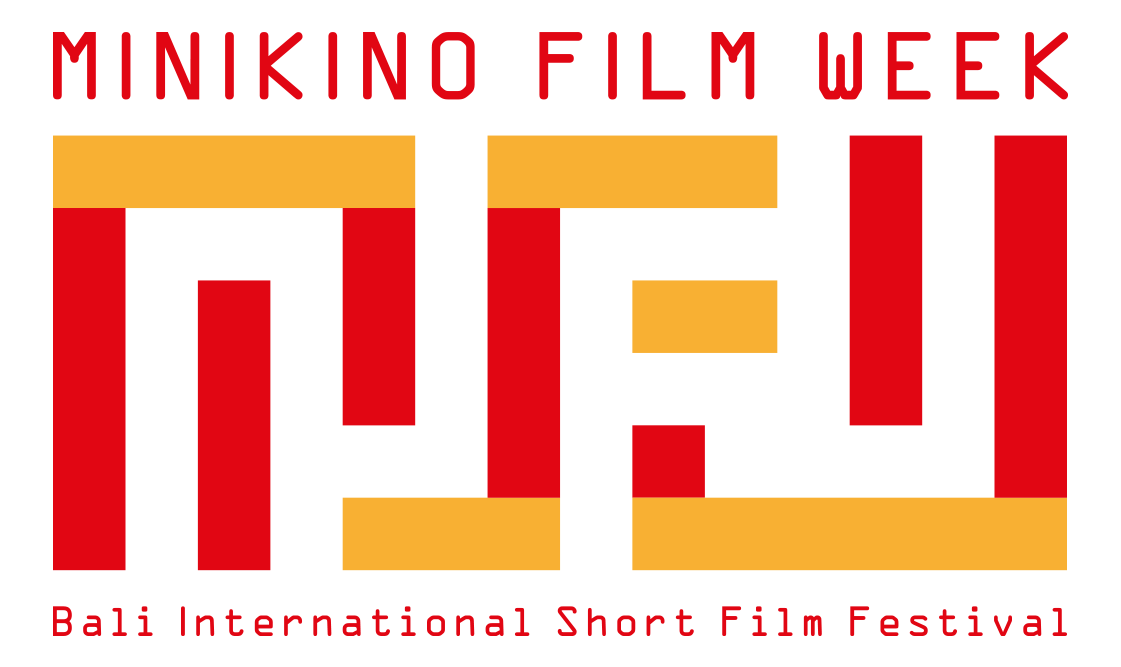

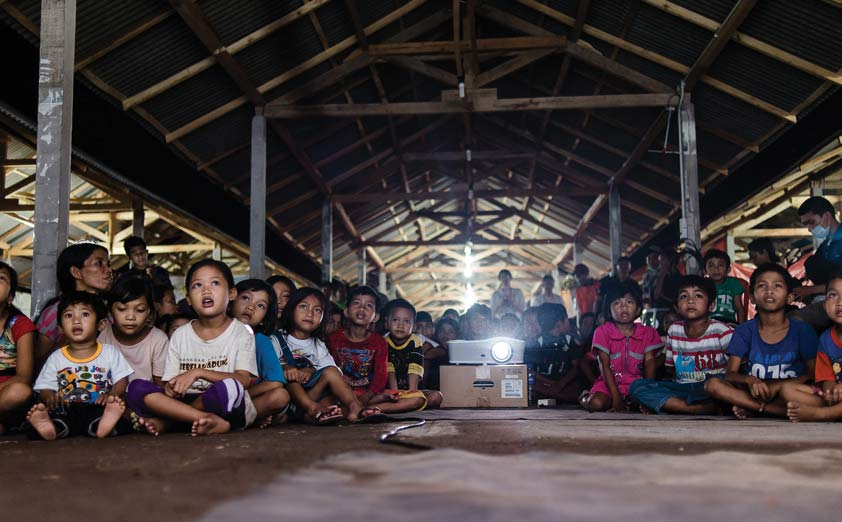
- Bali International Short Film Festival
- Location: Bali, Indonesia
- Founded: 2015
- Most recent: 2–10 September 2022
- Festival date: 15-23 September 2023
- Language: Internasional
- Website: www.minikino.org/filmweek/

Minikino Film Week, Bali International Short Film Festival (MFW) is an annual International short film festival in Bali, Indonesia. MFW was initiated in 2015, organized by the Minikino committee as its parent organization, which has been working in this field since 2002. The organization and MFW is under Indonesian legal entity; Yayasan Kino Media.

== History ==
Since 2002 the organization has routinely held the Minikino Monthly Screening & Discussion (MMSD) events. The monthly event takes turns presenting each of the S-Express network programs that are submitted by a collaborative network of short film programmers from various countries in Southeast Asia.

By presenting one after another S-Express programs and also adding other national and international short film programs, the monthly screening agenda for the whole year is fulfilled. Minikino programmer also present guest program at other international film festival such as The 7th annual Toronto Reel Asian International Film Festival in 2003.

The establishment of an annual short film festival has actually been discussed internally since 2004, but has been postponed several times.

2015

In early 2015, Minikino initiated a short film exchange program focusing on the national short film productions, the Indonesia Raja. These activities adopted what was implemented by S-Express. With the advent of this additional agenda, all available programs become too many to be held monthly within a year.

Minikino Film Week 2015 (MFW2015) then initiated, basically to deal with this situation. The first festival was held from 12 until 17 October 2015 to accommodate the increasing number of programs that once were meant to be in the monthly programs. The festival presents film selections from its film database and specifically invites short films from directors, distributors, and other film organizations. And also presents the annual short film program exchange; S-Express 2015 and the first year of Indonesia Raja. There were no open submissions.

2016

The 2nd Minikino Film Week (2ndMFW) was held the following year, from 8 until 15 October 2016. This is the first year the festival accepts open submission through MFW account in FilmFreeway platforms. Officially selected international films were presented in international programs, highlighting a particular theme, specific issues, genre, country or region of the world. 2nd MFW also presents several talks, workshops and networking events. And also a short film library for educators, professionals, distributors and festival programmers. Opening a limited access for professionals to preview Minikino's database of short films that has been submitted throughout the year.

2017 In 2017, the 3rdMFW initiated their annual national competition Begadang Filmmaking Competition. At the same time, 3rdMFW also presents a board of jury that judges and decides on several categories for international awards.

The opening ceremony of the festival, 7 October 2017 was attended by Ricky Joseph Pesik, the Deputy Head of The Creative Economy Agency (BEKRAF RI, then later merged into The Ministry of Tourism and Creative Economy in 2020).

On 24 September 2017, less than 2 weeks before the opening date, security conditions was in high alert due to the eruption of Bali's volcano of mount Agung. 3 locations (out of total 6 locations) of POP-UP Cinemas had to re-planned and moved to the evacuation camps.

The date, schedule and program content have not changed, except 1 cancellation of the last program "S-Express 2017 Indonesia" on October 13, 2017, for considering the young audience convenience at the evacuation camp. This program was supposedly screened at the Youth & Sports Education Building, Bangli.

2018

In early 2018, Minikino Film Week was among several Indonesian delegations brought by The Creative Economy Agency of Indonesia to the South by SouthWest (SXSW) 2018 Trade Show in Austin, Texas. During the trade show, Minikino managed to make contact with the Austin Film Festival. This network then brought several Indonesia's short films to be shown in their 2018 edition. In exchange, a guest program from Austin Film Festival then screened at MFW4 in Bali, Indonesia, during 6–13 October 2018.

In collaboration with RDR-Rotary Disaster Relief, Bali School Kids and Rotary Club Bali Denpasar, MFW4 held a post-festival roadshow to Lombok island from 2 until 4 November 2018. The roadshow held 2 screening events in 2 of the Lombok earthquake evacuation camps, the disaster that had recently happened.

2019

Minikino Film Week 5, with the travel support from BEKRAF RI, was able to invite Roger Gonin, one of the important figures of Clermont-Ferrand International Short Film Festival and also Jukka-Pekka Laakso, the director of Tampere Film Festival. Some important names in the Indonesia film industry were also invited and took part in panel discussions and presentations in the MFW Short Film Market.

This is the first time the term Short Film Market is used in Minikino Film Week, emphasizing the festival's sub-events to hold presentation panels, talks and short film libraries, all the activities that aimed at strengthening Indonesia's short film ecosystem and connecting it to the international networks.

This time with support from Purin Pictures, Minikino Film Week is repeating its trip to Lombok in a post-festival roadshow. The road trip starts from October 31, 2019, to November 5, 2019, visiting 3 evacuation camps that have not yet fully recovered since last year.

In the same year, Minikino Film Week became a member of The Short Film Conference the organization for the global short film community.

2020

In early 2020, several plans and preparations for MFW6 had to be put on hold due to the pandemic situation in Indonesia. Yet the in-person festival still managed to go according to plan, 4–12 September 2020. This was the first year for MFW accepting submissions through Short Film Depot. The festival's dates also moved earlier to September instead of October.

Responding to the global crisis situation to reduce the risk of COVID-19, Minikino Film Week 6 had to integrate several online activities, especially for seminars, conferences, workshops and discussions. In addition, in-person participants are also restricted to meet safe physical distances between spectators, and practice all recommended health protocols by the authorities. The number of audiences were limited by the process of online booking and implementing strict health protocols.

2021

Minikino Film Week 7 was held for 9 days from 3 to 11 September 2021, involving 12 Micro Cinema venues around the island of Bali. Responding to the continuation of the global crisis, the festival applied strict protocols to access. At least 1st shot of COVID-19 vaccine or a medical test (swab) with negative result is mandatory to get the Festival Pass. All screenings and activities are still free of charge, yet limited only for the pass holder. The digital or printed document from the audience should always be ready to be shown on the venues before entering the premises.

The festival presents 2 inclusive programs equipped with Bahasa Indonesia Audio Description and Closed Caption, giving access for the Blind and Deaf audience.

Although most of the festival events that had been planned were still able to be implemented, some major adjustments experienced due to the rise of Cov-19 Delta Variant crisis situation in Bali. 1 out of 3 Pop-Up Cinema had to be cancelled, due to the sudden increasing number and high Cov-19 cases in Buleleng area. The location of the opening event which was originally planned to be held in Sanur had to be moved to Geo Open Space in Kerobokan, due to the local lock down policy. 1 program at the open air cinema at Alliance Française Bali also had to be cancelled due to the rain.

Minikino Film Week 7 Post-Festival was decided not to be held this year, due to the uncertainty and ongoing pandemic emergency situation.

== Events ==
=== MINIKINO FILM WEEK 2015 ===
Held in Bali, Indonesia, 12 to 17 October 2015, presents 88 short films and 6 feature films and attracted 1656 audiences.

==== Program ====
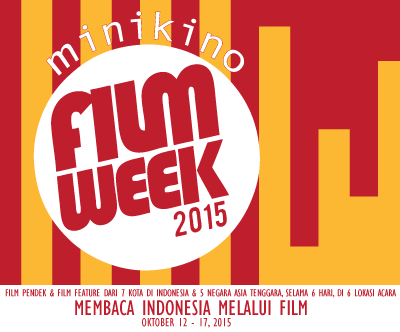
Minikino Filmweek 2015 official logo

- Indonesia Raja 2015 (Indonesia Short Film Program Exchange).
- S-EXPRESS 2015 (Southeast Asia Short Film Program Exchange).

Featuring Director: Tonny Trimarsanto

- First Time Public Screening BULU MATA (EYE LASHES)
- Renita Renita & Mangga Golek Matang di Pohon

Featuring Project Change

- Cerita Tentang Rahasia (Directed by Monica Vanesa Tedja, Yatna Pelangi, Mayk Wongkar, Anggun Pradesha and Rikky M. Fajar..)

Featuring KOLEKTIF

- Vakansi Yang Janggal dan Penyakit Lainnya (Dir: Yosep Anggi Noen)
- SITI (Dir: Eddie Cahyono / 2015)
- The Sun, The Moon & The Hurricane (Dir: Andry Cung)
- 3 Film Pendek Tentang SARA(S) (Dir: Kamila Andini, Yosep Anggi Noen, Lucky Kuswandi)

Special program

- Keluarkan Isi Hatiku (Get My Feelings Out) (Dir: Paul Agusta)
- Regional Feature: LELAKI HARAPAN DUNIA (Men Who Save the World) (Dir: Liew Seng Tat / Malaysia / 2014)
- CLOSING EVENT: MINIKINO SHORTS AUCTION

=== 2nd MINIKINO FILM WEEK (2016) ===
Held in Bali, Indonesia, 8 to15 October 2016. 11 Venues, 250+ Short Film, 4 Fringe Event.

==== Program ====
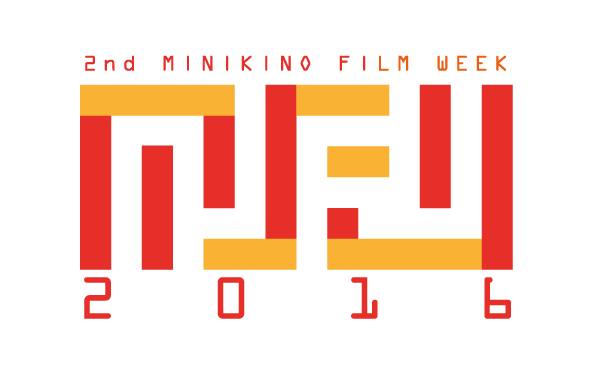
Official Logo 2nd Minikino Film Week

- Indonesia Raja 2016, the annual short film exchange between cities in Indonesia
- S-EXPRESS 2016, the annual short film exchange of South East Asia countries
- International Short Films selected from the open submission (68 Country, 158 Short Films selected out of 6557 entries)

Special Program

- Ombak Bali Film Festival
- ReelOzInd! Film Festival Australia

Fringe Events

- Journalistic Workshop with Sloka Institute.
- Photography Workshop with Bali Photo Forum
- Music Video Behind The Scene Discussion with Pygmy Marmoset.

=== 3rd MINIKINO FILM WEEK (2017) ===
Held in Bali, Indonesia, 7 to 14 Oktober 2017. The festival presents 225 International Short Films, including Indonesia in 20 venues, in total of 138 events.

==== Screening programs ====
- National programs: Indonesia Raja 2017
- South East-Asia selection; The S-Express 2017
- The International Selection
- Invited programs from other festival & organizational collaborators
  - ReelOzind! 2017 programs
  - Made in Malaysia: Liew Seng Tat's short films
  - Made in Indonesia: Sidi Saleh
  - Image Forum Festival: A Peek to Japan Tomorrow

==== Workshops and Presentations ====
- Acting Workshop with Paul Agusta
- Digital Cinematography Workshop with Benny Kadarhariarto

==== Begadang Filmmaking Competition in Minikino Film Week ====
This year was the 1st annual competition of Begadang Filmmaking Competition. The participants will get a list of audio-visual elements that has to be part of the film. Then they are required to produce a short film using these elements and the final film must have been submitted within 34 hours.

For 34 hours, the participants carried out the entire production process; from the story development until the final film submitted.

Grand Prize Winner of Begadang Filmmaking Competition 2017: ALMARI by Husyin & team Guru, from Banjarmasin, Kalimantan Selatan

==== International Competition in the 3rd Minikino Film Week ====
This year also the 1st time for the annual International Awarding. 3rd Minikino Film Week Award is an International award in the form of a non-monetary reward. Awards were announced and given on the awarding night, on October 14, 2017, at the closing ceremony of festival.

LIST OF AWARD WINNERS at THE 3rd MINIKINO FILM WEEK (2017)
AWARD CATEGORY	TITLE, Director, Country, Duration
SHORT FILM OF THE YEAR	BITCHBOY directed by Måns Berthas / Sweden / 15:00
SHORT FICTION AWARD	NAKAW directed by Noel Escondo, Arvin Belarmino / Philippines / 07:00
CHILDREN SHORT FILM AWARD	CARROT & PICKLE directed by Graciela Sarabia / United States / 05:12
SHORT DOCUMENTARY AWARD	COMMODITY CITY directed by Jessica Kingdon / United States / 10:43
VISUAL POETRY AWARD	URBAN AUDIO SPECTRUM directed by Marina Schnider / Germany / 03:43
PROGRAMMER’S PICK AWARD	RUAH directed by Flurin Giger / Switzerland / 18:00
SHORT ANIMATION AWARD	ECLIPSE directed by Jerrold Chong / United States / 06:20
S-EXPRESS 2017 RECOGNITION AWARD	SEPANJANG JALAN SATU ARAH directed by Bani Nasution / Indonesia / 16:00

==== The 2017 Post Festival Event ====
Held as a roadshow to Jakarta, for another screenings and presentation in 3 venues. It was held in 25–26 October 2017.

=== MINIKINO FILM WEEK 4 (2018) ===
Held in Bali, Indonesia, 6–13 October 2018

LIST OF AWARD WINNERS at THE MINIKINO FILM WEEK 4 (2018)
AWARD CATEGORY	TITLE, Director, Country, Duration
BEST SHORT FILM OF THE YEAR	KIMCHI directed by Jackson Segars / United States/ 14:38
BEST FICTION SHORT	SCHOOLYARD BLUES (SKOLSTARTSSORG) directed by Maria Eriksson-Hecht / Sweden/ 16:36
BEST CHILDREN SHORT	MOGU AND PEROL directed by Tsuneo Goda / Japan / 08:32
BEST DOCUMENTARY SHORT	THE SEVEN ABDULKARIMS directed by Elham Rokni / Israel/ 22:00
BEST AUDIO VISUAL EXPERIMENTAL SHORT	EDGE OF ALCHEMY directed by Stacey Steers / United States/ 17:15
PROGRAMMER’S CHOICE AWARD	KAMPUNG TAPIR directed by Aw See Wee / Malaysia/ 17:15
BEST ANIMATION SHORT	AIRPORT directed by Michaela Müller / Switzerland/Croatia / 10:35
YOUTH JURY AWARD 2018	SCHOOLYARD BLUES (SKOLSTARTSSORG) directed by Maria Eriksson-Hecht / Sweden/ 16:36
BEGADANG FILMMAKING COMPETITION 2018	TAKSA directed by Prasetyo Wibowo S. / Produksi Kecil / Denpasar

=== MINIKINO FILM WEEK 5 (2019) ===
Held in Bali, Indonesia, 5–12 October 2019

LIST OF AWARD WINNERS at THE MINIKINO FILM WEEK 5 (2019)
AWARD CATEGORY	TITLE, Director, Country
BEST SHORT FILM OF THE YEAR	FAUVE directed by Jeremy Comte, Canada.
BEST FICTION	VINEGAR BATHS directed by Amanda Nell Eu, Malaysia.
BEST CHILDREN SHORT	MILESTONE directed by Aviv Kaufman, Israel.
BEST ANIMATION SHORT	MY JUKE BOX directed by Florentine Grelier, France.
BEST DOCUMENTARY SHORT	THE TRAFFIC SEPARATING DEVICE directed by Johan Palmgren, Sweden.
BEST AUDIO VISUAL EXPERIMENTAL FILM	SISTERS directed by Daphne Lucker, Netherland.
PROGRAMMERS CHOICE	EVA directed by Xheni Alushi, Switzerland.
2019 YOUTH JURY AWARD	SISTERS directed by Daphne Lucker, Netherland.
BEGADANG FILMMAKING COMPETITION 2019	PENDEKAR TAFSIR MIMPI directed by Kevin Muhammad / Small Time Pictures

=== MINIKINO FILM WEEK 6 (2020) ===
Held in Bali, Indonesia, 4–12 September 2020

LIST OF AWARD WINNERS at THE MINIKINO FILM WEEK 6 (2020)
AWARD CATEGORY	TITLE, Director, Country, Duration
BEST SHORT FILM OF THE YEAR	A THOUSAND SAILS (木已成舟) directed by TSANG Hing Weng Eric / Hong Kong / 2019 / 15:00
NATIONAL COMPETITION AWARD	GOLDEN FRAMES IN THE CLOSET (Jemari yang Menari di Atas Luka-Luka) directed by Putri Sarah Amelia / Indonesia / 2019 / 16:22
BEST CHILDREN SHORT	SONIA LOVES, SONIA DOESN’T directed by Natalia Beliaeva / Russian Federation / 2020 / 15:00
BEST DOCUMENTARY SHORT	MAMA MANIA directed by Vincent Sparreboom / Netherlands / 2019 / 13:00
BEST ANIMATION SHORT	AND THEN THE BEAR (L’Heure de l’Ours) directed by Agnès Patron / France / 2019 / Animation / 13:52
BEST FICTION SHORT	CAYENNE directed by Simon Gionet / Canada / 2020 / 10:59
PROGRAMMER’S CHOICE	WHEN LIGHT FADES directed by Daan Groot / Netherlands / 2020 / 11:03
BEST AUDIO VISUAL EXPERIMENTAL SHORT	THIS MAKES ME WANT TO PREDICT THE PAST directed by Cana Bilir-Meier / Germany / 2019 / 16:02
YOUTH JURIES AWARD	END-O directed by Alice Seabright / United Kingdom / 2019 / Fiction / 15:00
BEGADANG FILMMAKING COMPETITION 2020	HAI GUYS BALIK LAGI SAMA GUE, TUHAN! directed by Winner Wijaya / Indonesia / 2020 / 04:30

=== MINIKINO FILM WEEK 7 (2021) ===
Held in Bali, Indonesia, 3–11 September 2021

LIST OF AWARD WINNERS at THE MINIKINO FILM WEEK 7 (2021)
AWARD CATEGORY	TITLE, Director, Country, Duration
BEST SHORT FILM OF THE YEAR	I AM AFRAID TO FORGET YOUR FACE directed by Sameh Alaa / Egypt, France, Belgium, Qatar / 2020 / Fiction / 14:55
NATIONAL COMPETITION AWARD	MASA DEPAN CERAH 2040 directed by Winner Wijaya / Indonesia / 2021 / Fiction / 11:00
BEST CHILDREN SHORT	GIRLSBOYSMIX (Meisjesjongensmix) directed by Lara Aerts / Nederland / 2020 / Documentary / 06:42
BEST DOCUMENTARY SHORT	WHY DIDN’T YOU STAY FOR ME (Waarom Blijf Je Niet Voor Mij?) directed by Milou Gevers / Netherlands / 2020 / 25:00
BEST ANIMATION SHORT	THORNS AND FISHBONES directed by Natália Azevedo Andrade / Hungary / 2020 / 09:47
BEST FICTION SHORT	MAKASSAR IS A CITY FOR FOOTBALL FANS (LIKA LIKU LAKI) directed by Khozy Rizal / Indonesia / 2020 / 20:00
PROGRAMMER’S CHOICE	A LONELY AFTERNOON directed by Kyle Credo / Canada / 2020 / Fiction / 14:41
BEST AUDIO VISUAL EXPERIMENTAL SHORT	INSIDE directed by Yann Chapotel / France / 2020 / 05:45
BEGADANG FILMMAKING COMPETITION 2021	PRO CAST directed by Immanuel Kurniawan, Victoria Film / Malang, Jawa Timur / 2021 / 05:05
THE RWI ASIA PACIFIC AWARD AT MFW7	THE LAST BREATH OF THE TONLE SAP. directed by Thomas Cristofoletti, Robin Narciso / Cambodia / 2020 / Documentary / 10:21
MFW7 NATIONAL JURY MENTION	CHINTYA directed by Sesarina Puspita / Indonesia / 2019 / Fiction / 23:59; SALMIYAH directed by Harryaldi Kurniawan / Indonesia / 2019 / Documentary / 22:40

=== MINIKINO FILM WEEK 8 (2022) ===
Held in Bali, Indonesia for 9 days, from September 2, 2022, the opening event, until September 10, 2022. This series of events concludes on the last day with the screenings of all the winning short films announced on 9 September 2022.

LIST OF AWARD WINNERS 2022
AWARD CATEGORIES	TITLES & FILMMAKERS
MFW BEST SHORT FILM OF THE YEAR 2022	WARSHA directed by Dania Bdeir / Lebanon / 2021 / 15:42
MFW NATIONAL COMPETITION AWARD 2022	RIDE TO NOWHERE directed by Khozy Rizal / Indonesia / 2022 / Fiction / 15:00
MFW8 BEST CHILDREN SHORT	MORA MORA directed by Jurga Šeduikytė / Lithuania / 2021 / 10:05
MFW8 BEST DOCUMENTARY SHORT	THE SOUND OF THE TIME (I suoni del tempo) directed by Jeissy Trompiz / Colombia / 2021 / 15:00
MFW8 BEST ANIMATION SHORT	EYES AND HORNS (아이즈앤혼즈) directed by Chaerin Im / South Korea / 2021 / 06:15
MFW8 BEST FICTION SHORT	HANTU directed by Kim Kokosky Deforchaux / The Netherlands / 2021 / Fiction / 19:00
MFW8 PROGRAMMER’S CHOICE	WORK IT CLASS! directed by Pol Diggler / Spain / 2021 / 08:00
MFW8 BEST AUDIO VISUAL EXPERIMENTAL SHORT	ANGLE MORT (Blind spot) directed by Lotfi Achour / Tunisia, France / 2021 / 13:13
YOUTH JURY AWARD 2022	SIDÉRAL directed by Carlos Segundo / France, Brazil / 2021 / Fiction / 15:00
BEGADANG COMPETITION 2022 WINNER	CHICKEN AWAKEN produced by Nol Derajat Film / Kota Malang, Jawa Timur / 2022 / Fiction / 05:27
MFW8 NATIONAL JURY MENTION	TEGUH directed by Riani Singgih / Indonesia / 2021 / Documentary / 14:59.
THE RWI ASIA PACIFIC AWARD AT MFW8, Main Prize	BAGAN (Sudden Uncertainty) directed by Firdaus Balam / Malaysia / 2021 / Fiction / 24:35
THE RWI ASIA PACIFIC AWARD AT MFW8, 2nd Winner	PHA HOM (The Blanket) directed by Mitpasa SITTHIHAKPANYA / Laos / 2021 / Fiction / 18:17
THE RWI ASIA PACIFIC AWARD AT MFW8, Honorable Mention	THE PARTIAN directed by Hadafi Raihan Karim / Indonesia / 2021 / Fiction / 08:40

POST FESTIVAL ROADSHOW 2022

From 22 October 2022 to 11 November 2022, Minikino Film Week then held a Post Festival Roadshow 2022, bringing this year's winning short films to 8 cities in Indonesia. The events held were in the form of short film screenings and several presentations focused on various elements in short film festival management.

In all of these activities, Minikino visits and collaborates with local film communities as well as universities, film festival organizations such as the Aceh Film Festival (Aceh), the Flobamora Film Festival in Kupang, Cinema Cirebon (Cirebon, West Java), UMN (Tangerang), Sinekoci (Palu, Central Sulawesi) and the ISI Padang Panjang student group.

=== Minikino Film Week 9 (2023) ===
The ninth edition of Minikino Film Week took place from 15 to 23 September 2023.

2023 award winners
Award category	Winner
MFW9 Best Short Film of the Year	Yellow by Elham Ehsas (Afghanistan / United Kingdom)
MFW9 National Competition Award	Chorus of the Wounded Birds by Amar Haikal (Indonesia); Special Mention: I Saw a Ghost, and It Was Beautiful by Bobby Fernando ( Indonesia) and Iya Iya Iya Iya by Winner Wijaya ( Indonesia)
MFW9 Best Animation Short	Little Smasher by Gilles Cuvelier (France)
MFW9 Best Audio Visual Experimental Short	The Altar by Moe Myat May Zarchi (Myanmar)
MFW9 Best Children Short	I'm Not Afraid! by Marita Mayer (Germany / Norway)
MFW9 Best Documentary Short	Ponto Final by Miguel López Beraza (Spain / Portugal)
MFW9 Best Fiction Short	The Good Father by Jorge Cañada Escorihuela (Spain)
MFW9 Programmer's Choice	Intro by Anne Isensee (Germany)
Youth Jury Award	Fairplay by Zoel Aeschbacher (Switzerland / France)
Begadang Filmmaking Competition Winner	Pisang Robot Satu Kata by Fauzan Al Habibie (Indonesia); Special Mention: Trashtalk by Rizqullah Ramadhan Panggabean ( Indonesia)
RWI Asia Pacific Award	First Winner: Blue Poetry by Muhammad Heri Fadli (Indonesia); Second Winner: The Wedding Ring by Robin Narciso (Cambodia); Honorable Mention: Acung Decides To Speak Up by Amelia Hapsari (Indonesia)
Rangkai Award	Blue Poetry by Muhammad Heri Fadli (Indonesia)

=== Minikino Film Week 10 (2024) ===
The tenth edition of Minikino Film Week took place from 13 to 20 September 2024.

2024 award winners
Award category	Winner
MFW Best Short Film of the Year	The Key by Rakan Mayasi (Palestine / Belgium / Qatar / France)
MFW National Competition Award	Samu the Terrible and His Sin by Dhiwangkara Seta (Indonesia); Special Mention: The Swallowing Sea by Afif Fahmi ( Indonesia) and Arabic Mantra by Tunggul Banjaransari ( Indonesia)
MFW10 Best Animation Short	Sweet Like Lemons by Jenny Jokela (United Kingdom / Finland)
MFW10 Best Audio Visual Experimental Short	Thirteenth Night by Rachel Song (China)
MFW10 Best Children Short	Ferrari by Philip Ivancsics (Austria)
MFW10 Best Documentary Short	History Is Written at Night by Alejandro Alonso (Cuba / France)
MFW10 Best Fiction Short	Amplified by Dina Naser (Jordan / Egypt / Palestine)
MFW10 Programmer's Choice	A Fermenting Woman by Priscilla Galvez (Canada)
Youth Jury Award	This Is Raquel's Not-so-secret Diary by Raquel Agea (Spain)
Begadang8Tahun Filmmaking Competition Winner	The City Is Calling by Syakir Mardhatillah (Indonesia); Special Mention: Kiwo Tengen by Rizqullah Panggabean ( Indonesia)
RWI Human Rights Film Award	The Swallowing Sea by Afif Fahmi (Indonesia)

=== Minikino Film Week 11 (2025) ===
The eleventh edition of Minikino Film Week took place from 12 to 19 September 2025.

2024 award winners
Award category	Winner
MFW Best Short Film of the Year	Park by Guil Sela (France)
MFW Best National Competition Award	When the Blues Goes Marching In by Beny Kristia (Indonesia); Special Mention: My Therapist Said, I Am Full of Sadness by Monica Vanesa Tedja ( Indonesia)
MFW11 Best Animation Short	S the Wolf by Sameh Alaa (France / Egypt)
MFW11 Best Audio Visual Experimental Short	Durian, Durian by Nelson Yeo (Singapore)
MFW11 Best Children Short	A King Without a Crown by Olivier Bayu Gandrille (France)
MFW11 Best Documentary Short	Their Eyes by Nicolas Gourault (France)
MFW11 Best Fiction Short	Blue Heart by Samuel Suffren (Haiti / France)
MFW11 Programmer's Choice	Blitzmusik by Martin Amiot (Canada)
Youth Jury Award	Monsoon Blue by Jay Hiukit Wong and Ellis Kayin Chan (China)
Begadang9Tahun Filmmaking Competition Winner	Imam and His 9 Friends by Deru Ibnu Ghiffari (Indonesia)
