= Under the Moonlight (2023 film) =

2023 documentary film by Tonny Trimarsanto

- Promotional poster
- Indonesian: Nur
- Directed by: Tonny Trimarsanto
- Produced by: John Badalu; Es Damayanti; Tonny Trimarsanto
- Cinematography: Tonny Trimarsanto
- Edited by: Greg Arya
- Production company: Rumah Dokumenter
- Release date: 14 November 2023 (IDFA)
- Running time: 86 minutes
- Country: Indonesia
- Language: Indonesian

Under the Moonlight (Indonesian: Nur) is a 2023 documentary film directed by Tonny Trimarsanto. The film had its world premiere at the 2023 International Documentary Film Festival Amsterdam on 14 November 2023. It won the Best Documentary Feature at the 2024 Indonesian Film Festival.

== Premise ==
Under the Moonlight follows Nur, a trans woman who works as a cook at the Al Fatah pesantren in Yogyakarta, where all the adult students are transgender.

== Release ==
Under the Moonlight had its world premiere at the 2023 International Documentary Film Festival Amsterdam on 14 November 2023 during the Luminous section. It also competed at the Jakarta Film Week and Yogyakarta Documentary Film Festival in 2024.

== Accolades ==
| Award | Date of ceremony | Category | Recipient(s) | Result | Ref. |
|---|---|---|---|---|---|
| Jakarta Film Week | 27 October 2024 | Direction Award | Tonny Trimarsanto | Nominated | |
| Yogyakarta Documentary Film Festival | 9 November 2024 | Indonesia Feature-Length Competition Award | Tonny Trimarsanto | Nominated | |
| Indonesian Film Festival | 20 November 2024 | Best Documentary Feature | John Badalu, Es Damayanti, and Tonny Trimarsanto | Won | |
