= Pernikahan Arwah =

- Directed by: Paul Agusta
- Written by: Ario Sasongko; Aldo Swastia
- Produced by: Perlita Desiani
- Starring: Morgan Oey; Zulfa Maharani; Jourdy Pranata; Brigitta Cynthia; Puty Sjahrul
- Cinematography: Ivan Anwal Pane
- Edited by: Dinda Amanda
- Music by: Indra Perkasa
- Production companies: Entelekey Media Indonesia; Relate Films
- Release date: February 27, 2025 (Indonesia)
- Running time: 101 minutes
- Country: Indonesia
- Language: Indonesian

Pernikahan Arwah is a 2025 Indonesian supernatural horror romance film directed by Paul Agusta, written by Ario Sasongko and Aldo Swastia, and produced by Entelekey Media Indonesia and Relate Films. The film stars Morgan Oey and Zulfa Maharani as a Chinese-Indonesian couple whose pre-wedding shoots are disturbed by a ghost with ties to the dark past of the groom's family.

The film premiered in Indonesia on 27 February 2025 and on Netflix on 3 July. The film also showed in 36 countries in North America, South America, the Caribbean, and Southeast Asia.

== Plot ==
Salim and Tasya are so happy because they are about to get married. Before the wedding, the couple holds a sangjit, an engagement process as well as a celebration of the unification of their two families ahead of their marriage. Everything seems fine until Tasya starts experiencing strange things during the sangjit. At first, she sees the apparition of a mysterious old woman with white hair during the ceremony. Salim's Engkim (Note: Hokkien honorific for aunt, wife of mom's sibling) Fang Fang reportedly passed away right after the sangjit event concluded. Since Salim is the only family member of Engkim Fang Fang, he has no choice but to perform the burial rituals and take care of her funeral. In addition to handling her funeral, Salim is also required to continue the family ritual of burning incense daily on an altar in a mysterious house that frequently appears in Tasya's dreams. As a result, the pre-wedding photo session, which was initially planned to take place in Hong Kong, is moved to that house. When the photoshoot team led by Febri arrives at that house, they begin to be disturbed and haunted by the spirit of a Chinese-Indonesian bride who seems to want something from Tasya and Salim.

During the photo shoot, Tasya suddenly faints. The photo team finds strange results where it looks like there is a shadow behind Salim and Tasya. After regaining consciousness, Tasya sees the apparition of a woman in a red wedding dress who then led her to a hidden room where Mei Hwa's body was stored. Harja, feeling very frightened, decides to leave the house. The next day, Salim, along with Febri, buries Mei Hwa's body in her grave in the yard. Tasya's increasingly strange behavior leads Arin to visit Koh Chung-Chung at the klenteng, who tells him that there is a strong energy of sadness in the house and suggests performing a spirit wedding ritual. Tasya begins to see Mei Hwa's past life during the Japanese occupation, where her fiancé Bhanu and his family were killed by Japanese soldiers on their wedding day. Mei Hwa eventually committed suicide. Unconsciously, Tasya also almost takes her own life before being stopped by Salim. Koh Chung-Chung then arrives at the house and begins performing the spirit wedding ritual.

Because they are unable to find Bhanu's spirit for marriage, Koh Chung-Chung suggests that someone should retrieve Bhanu's spirit from the afterlife. Through a ritual performed, Tasya enters the afterlife to search for Bhanu. During this process, Febri, who secretly liked Tasya, knocks Salim unconscious. Febri, wanting to take Tasya away from the house, kills Koh Chung-Chung. But Salim, who regained consciousness after being awakened by Arin, manages to knock out Febri before taking Tasya away. Tasya successfully finds Bhanu in the afterlife, but upon returning to the human world, she is shocked to find Koh Chung-Chung who had died and is preventing Salim from continuing the spirit marriage ritual by marrying Febri to Mei Hwa. Febri, who then came to his senses, hit Salim and tries to kill him, but is stopped by someone's voice.

Not long after, Febri sees Tasya walking upside down on the ceiling, and Salim suddenly wakes up behaving strangely. Arin, who had gone to call the police, returns to the house and finds Febri lifeless. Two butterflies fly and land on the altar, meanwhile Salim and Tasya walked hand in hand down the street while humming.

== Cast ==
- Morgan Oey as Salim
- Zulfa Maharani as Tasya, Salim's fiancée
- Jourdy Pranata as Febri, prewedding photographer
- Brigitta Cynthia as Mei Hwa
  - Liau Me Fang as Mei Hwa's corpse
- Puty Sjahrul as Arin, Tasha's makeup artist
- Ama Gerald as Harja, photoshoot team member
- Alam Setiawan as Bhanu
- Verdi Solaiman as Koh Chung-Chung
- Bernadette Bonita as Wen Ling
- Endy Chris as Tio
- Nenek Acih as Engkim Fang Fang
- Umi Kalsum as Linda
- Dody Patah as Chandra
- Franky Immanuel as MC

== Production ==
Principal photography was done in Lasem, Rembang, Central Java, chosen by Agusta as the kecamatan has a strong Chinese heritage. The house used for most of the film is 200 years old. Oey did personal research by discussing with older members of his family to deepen his knowledge on spirit marriage.

== Release ==
The film premiered in Indonesia on 27 February 2025 and on Netflix on 3 July. The film also showed in 36 countries in North America, South America, the Caribbean, and Southeast Asia, including Taiwan and 7 Southeast Asian countries Vietnam, Cambodia, Malaysia, the Philippines, Laos, Brunei, and Myanmar.
