= Show Me Shorts =

Short film festival in New Zealand

Show Me Shorts is an international short film festival held in Auckland and other venues across New Zealand. It screens a selection of short films from New Zealand and around the world in cinemas nationwide each spring.

Each year approximately 80 top short films are selected and contend for awards. The festival awards are then presented to the top filmmakers at the opening night and awards ceremony in Auckland. Show Me Shorts is New Zealand's first Academy Awards-accredited festival, with the Best Film and Best International Film award winners becoming eligible for nomination for the Oscars.

The programme covers a diverse range of themes and subjects including documentary, sci-fi, horror, drama, animation and comedy. Since 2014, a music video competitive category has been included. There are a number of supporting events such as a lab for screenwriters and filmmaker talks for aspiring filmmakers that run as part of the festival.

== History ==
Show Me Shorts Film Festival Trust is a registered charitable trust founded in Auckland in 2006 by Gina Dellabarca, MNZM, Tamara Liebman, Katrin Hagen, and Kate Nicholson.

The first screenings took place at Auckland's Academy Cinema in November, 2006. The following year the festival expanded to a full week in Auckland, plus screenings in Wellington, Christchurch and Dunedin. More locations and venues have since been added to the circuit.

In 2013 Show Me Shorts gained Academy Awards-accreditation for their Best New Zealand Film Award, allowing the festival to provide a pathway to the Oscars for filmmakers. In 2016 the festival additionally acquired Academy Awards-accreditation for their Best International Film Award.

== Winners 2026 ==
Category	Winner (film / person or team)
Best New Zealand Film (Oscar qualifying)	Julie Zhu and Ana Chaya Scotney for 'Kurī'
Best International Film (Oscar qualifying)	Lucas Tothe, Jessica Arfuso, Adrian Moyse Dullin and Jawahine Zentar for 'Soleil Pâle (Pale Sun)' (France)
Toi Whakaari Best Actor	Keporah Torrance for 'Kurī'
Script to Screen Best Screenplay	Jack Woon for '埋單Let’s Settle This!'
DEGNZ Best Editor	Anna Frances Pearson for 'Bob & C-Nut: A Good Way to Start the Day'
DEGNZ Best Director	Tom Noakes for 'The Worm'
Kōawa Studios Best Cinematographer	Tim Flower for 'Socks'
People's Choice Award	Pranav Bhasin and Yash Gonsai for "We Were Here"

== Winners 2025 ==
Category	Winner (film / person or team)
Department of Post Best New Zealand Film (Oscar qualifying)	Laura Ganotis, Arthur Gay for 'When the Geese Flew'
Best International Film (Oscar qualifying)	Jake Wachtel, Sok Visal, Alan R. Milligan for 'The Sentry' (Cambodia, Norway, USA)
Toi Whakaari Best Actor	Dahnu Graham for 'Flagfall'
Script to Screen Best Screenplay	Alex Farley for 'Wild Nights, Wild Nights!'
DEGNZ Best Editor	Joe Lonie for 'Flagfall'
DEGNZ Best Director	Allan George for 'Mirumiru (Bubble)'
Best Cinematographer	Dave Garbett for 'Ace'
NZ On Air Best Music Video	Marlon Williams, Jessica Todd for 'Aua Atu Rā'
People's Choice Award	Ray Edwards, Lindsay Gough for 'Ace'

== Winners 2024 ==
Category	Winner (film / person or team)
Department of Post Best New Zealand Film (Oscar qualifying)	Vea Mafile'o, Eldon Booth, Alex Lovell for 'Lea Tupu'anga (Mother Tongue)'
Best International Film (Oscar qualifying)	Mahdiye Ghotbedinmohamadi, Mohadeseh Pirhadi for 'The Brother'
Toi Whakaari Best Actor	Kura Turuwhenua for 'Honey Kaha'
Best Screenplay	Lucy Suess for 'Pack Rat'
DEGNZ Best Editor	Meg Trotter for 'Hitchhiking is Safe'
DEGNZ Best Director	Ian Sweeney for 'Figment'
Best Cinematographer	Ryan Heron for 'Rochelle'
NZ On Air Best Music Video	Hattie Adams, Ryan Bradley, Summer Vaha'akolo for 'Tōtara'
People's Choice Award	Loren Jalyn Kett and Julie Gursha for 'My Dying Place'

== Winners 2023 ==
Category	Winner (film / person or team)
Department of Post Best New Zealand Film (Oscar qualifying)	Jazz dos Santos, Puteri Raja Ariff, Julie Zhu for 'Lǎo Lao Lǎo Le'
Best International Film (Oscar qualifying)	Khozy Rizal, John Badalu, Sue Turley for Basri & Salma in a Never-Ending Comedy
Toi Whakaari Best Actor	Shared between Prabha Ravi for 'Anu' and Yan Lin for 'Lǎo Lao Lǎo Le'
Best Screenplay	Maza White for 'Daughter of God'
DEGNZ Best Editor	Jeremy Leatinu’u & Ian Powell for 'Te Whakawhitinga'
DEGNZ Best Director	Julie Zhu for 'Lǎo Lao Lǎo Le
Best Cinematographer	Marty Williams for 'The Ballad of Maddog Quinn'
NZ On Air Best Music Video	Ian Sweeney & Johnny Gilbert for 'When You Went Away - The Transits'
People's Choice Award	Anna Rose Duckworth, Ali Burns, Casey Latch, Mikaela Rüegg for 'Just Kidding I Actually Love You'

== Winners 2022 ==
Category	Winner (film / person or team)
Department of Post Best New Zealand Film (Oscar qualifying)	Mark Albiston, Sharlene George, Gal Greenspan and Andrew Mauger for 'Datsun'
Best International Film (Oscar qualifying)	Thijs Bouman, Rosalien Hollestelle, Noa Zimmerman for 'De Pinpas (The Debit Card)'
Toi Whakaari Best Actor	Villa Junior Lemanu for 'Atali'i O Le Crezent (Sons of the Crezent)'
Final Draft Best Screenplay	Ian Sweeney for 'Time Tourists'
DEGNZ Best Editor	Richard Shaw for 'Breathe'
DEGNZ Best Director	Brendan Canty for 'Atali'i O Le Crezent (Sons of the Crezent)'
Best Cinematographer	Marty Williams for 'Datsun'
NZ On Air Best Music Video	Zoe McIntosh and Frith Armstrong for 'Better Daze by Hoss'
People's Choice Award	Valentine Taylor, Roberto Nascimento, Belinda Bradley, Perry Bradley for 'Atali'i O Le Crezent (Sons of the Crezent)'

== Winners 2021 ==
Category	Winner (film / person or team)
Department of Post Best New Zealand Film (Oscar qualifying)	Bree Greally, Lily Martin-Babin for 'Miro Wine'
Best International Film (Oscar qualifying)	Alies Sluiter, Meng Xiong, Federica Belletti, William Littleton for 'Ayaan (Australia)'
Toi Whakaari Best Actor	Jodie Hillock for 'Blood and Gold'
Final Draft Best Screenplay	Sam Gill for 'Fetch'
DEGNZ Best Editor	Peter Roberts and Dwayne Cameron for 'June'
DEGNZ Best Director	Isaacc Bell for 'Space Invader'
Panavision Best Cinematographer	Kieran Fowler for 'Giants'
NZ On Air Best Music Video	Logan Marshall for 'New Day' by Gino October
SAE People's Choice Award	Rachel Ross, Morgan Leigh Stewart and Samantha Dutton for 'Green'

== Winners 2020 ==
Category	Winner (film / person or team)
Department of Post Best New Zealand Film	Tweedie Waititi & Cian Elyse White for 'Daddy's Girl (Kōtiro)'
Best International Film	Erenik Beqiri, Olivier Berlemont, Émilie Dubois, Ermir Keta & Amantia Peza for 'The Van'
NZ On Air Best Music Video	Emma Mortimer & Dylan Pharazyn for 'Career' by Wax Chattels
Panavision Best Cinematographer	Fred Renata for 'Daddy's Girl (Kōtiro)'
Toi Whakaari Best Actor	Margaret Sydenham for 'Hot Chocolate'
Final Draft Best Screenplay	Kathryn Burnett & James Cunningham for 'Prickly Jam'
DEGNZ Best Editor	Dylan Pharazyn for 'Career' by Wax Chattels
DEGNZ Best Director	Isaac Knights-Washbourn for 'Money Honey'
People's Choice Award	Jake Mokomoko & Claire Varley for 'Hāngī Pants'

== Winners 2019 ==
Category	Winner (film / person or team)
NZ On Air Best Music Video	Alexander Gandar, Tom Augustine & Amanda Jane Robinson for 'One By the Venom – Finn Andrews'
Panavision Best Cinematographer	Maria Inés Manchego for 'Ani'
Toi Whakaari Best Actor	Margaret Sydenham for 'Hush'
Final Draft Best Screenplay	Judith Cowley for 'Walk a Mile'
DEGNZ Best Editor	Annie Collins for 'Rū'
DEGNZ Best Director	Armağan Ballantyne for 'Hush'
Best International Film	Ithaca Yixian Deng & Hao Zheng for 'The Chef'
Department of Post Best New Zealand Film	Sarah Cook & Josephine Stewart-Te Whiu for 'Ani'
SAE People's Choice	Yves Piat, Damien Megherbi and Justin Pechberty for 'Nefta Football Club'

== Winners 2018 ==
Category	Winner (film / person or team)
NZ On Air Best Music Video	Alexander Gandar & Kate Moses for 'Laugh it Off – Chelsea Jade'
Panavision Best Cinematographer	Ian McCarroll for 'The Brother'
Toi Whakaari Best Actor	Villa Junior Lemanu for 'My Friend Michael Jones'
Final Draft Best Screenplay	Eldon Booth, Ian Leaupepe & Samson Rambo for 'My Friend Michael Jones'
DEGNZ Best Editor	Betsy Bauer for 'Cleaver'
DEGNZ Best Director	Summer Agnew for 'The Brother'
NZFC Special Jury Prize	Simeon Duncombe for Production Design for 'Toilet'
SAE Best International Film	Sorcha Bacon & Harry Lighton for 'Wren Boys'
Department of Post Best New Zealand Film	Alex Lovell, Eldon Booth, Ian Leaupepe & Samson Rambo for 'My Friend Michael Jones'
People's Choice	Arielle Sullivan and Kyan Krumdieck for 'Repugnant'

== Winners 2017 ==
Category	Winner (film / person or team)
NZ On Air Best Music Video	THUNDERLIPS & Candlelit Pictures for 'Turtles – LarzRanda'
NZFC Best Student Film	Amberley Jo Aumua for 'Waiting'
Panavision Best Cinematographer	Andrew McGeorge for 'Do No Harm'
Toi Whakaari Best Actor	Marion Prebble for 'Baby?'
Final Draft Best Screenplay	Lauren Porteous in 'Motel'
DEGNZ Best Editor	Tom Eagles for 'Do No Harm'
DEGNZ Best Director	Zoe McIntosh for 'The World in Your Window'
Showtools Special Jury Prize	Tim Wong for 'Do No Harm' (Stunt Coordination)
Best International Film	Peter Ghesquiere, Hendrik Verthe, Kobe Van Steenberghe & Frank Van Passel for 'Downside Up'
Best New Zealand Film	Phil Brough, Matt Heath & Orlando Stewart for 'Fire in Cardboard City'
People's Choice	Zoe McIntosh for 'The World in Your Window'

== Winners 2016 ==
Category	Winner (film / person or team)
Lightbox Best Film	Georgiana Plaister & Ned Wenlock for 'Spring Jam'
Best International Film	Tim Ellrich for 'Die Badewanne' (The Bathtub)
DEGNZ Best Director	Ned Wenlock for 'Spring Jam'
StarNow Best Actor	Katlyn Wong in 'Wait'
Final Draft Best Screenplay	Hugh Calveley for 'Cradle'
Panavision Best Cinematographer	Simon Baumfield for 'Feeder'
DEGNZ Best Editor	Bryan Shaw for 'Shout at the Ground'
NZFC Special Jury Prize	Yamin Tun for 'Wait'
Best Music Video	THUNDERLIPS & Candlelit Pictures for 'Breath - Sheep, Dog & Wolf'
People's Choice	James Cunningham and Oliver Hilbert for 'Kitten Witch'

== Winners 2015 ==
Category	Winner (film / person or team)
Lightbox Best Film	Alyx Duncan for 'The Tide Keeper'
Best International Film	Jonathan Stein for 'Out of the Village'
DEGNZ Best Director	Alyx Duncan for 'The Tide Keeper'
StarNow Best Actor	Tina Cleary in 'Cub'
Final Draft Best Screenplay	Ryan Heron & Guy Montgomery for 'Return'
Panavision Best Cinematographer	Chris Pryor & Ben Montgomery for 'The Tide Keeper'
DEGNZ Best Editor	James Cunningham for 'Accidents, Blunders & Calamities'
NZFC Special Jury Prize	Mhairead Connor for 'UFO'
Best Music Video	THUNDERLIPS for 'The Eversons - Emily'
Best Student Film	Kyan Krumdieck & Annabelle Dick for 'The Grind'
People's Choice	James Cunningham & Oliver Hilbert for 'Accidents, Blunders & Calamities'

== Winners 2014 ==
Category	Winner (film / person or team)
Show Me Shorts Best Film	Julia Parnell and Matthew J. Saville for 'Dive'
Best International Film	Marcel Barelli for 'Vigia (Lookout)'
DEGNZ Best Director	Hamish Bennet for ‘Ross & Beth'
StarNow Best Actor	Jackie van Beek in ‘Uphill’
Final Draft Best Screenplay	Matthew J. Saville for 'Dive'
Panavision Best Cinematographer	Ginny Loane for ‘Helmut Makes a Quilt’
Best Editor	Annie Collins for ‘Eleven’
NZFC Special Jury Prize	Paul Neason and Steffen Kreft for 'Queenie'
Best Music Video	Alix Whittaker and THUNDERLIPS for 'Glare' by Sheep, Dog & Wolf
Student Film, Notable Mention	Yarden Elyashiv for 'Bars and Tone'
Wendy's People's Choice Award	Charlie Bleakley and Cohen Holloway for 'Coconut'.

== Winners 2013 ==
Category	Winner (film / person or team)
Rush Munro's Best Film	Matt Heath, Anna Geddes, Cass Donaldson and Joe Lonie for 'Honk If You're Horny'
Panavision Best Cinematographer	John Chrisstoffels for 'Here Be Monsters'
Mexicali Fresh Best Student Film	Walter Lawry for ‘Blind Mice
StarNow Best Actor	Andy Anderson for his role in ‘Honk If You're Horny’
Script to Screen & NZ Writers Guild Best Screen Play	Nic Gorman for 'Here Be Monsters'
SDGNZ Best Director	Joe Lonie for ‘Honk If You're Horny’
SDGNZ Best Editor	Thomas Gleeson for ‘Home’
NZFC Special Jury Prize	Thomas Gleeson for 'Home'
Best International Film	Michael Rittmannsberger and Simon Baumgartner, Abgestempelt (Punched)
RPM Best Colourist	Jon Newell, Chris Rudkin and Erin Woolhouse for 'Here Be Monsters'
People's Choice Award	Ben Woollen and Scott Granville for 'Serve and Protect'

== Winners 2012 ==
Category	Winner (film / person or team)
Show Me Shorts Best Film	Matt Noonan & Chelsea Winstanley for ‘Night Shift
Panavision Best Cinematographer	Ari Wegner for ‘Night Shift'
Best Student Film	Lauren Eisinger & Katherine France for ‘Kia Kaha’
StarNow Best Actor	Anapela Polataivao for her role in ‘Night Shift’
Script to Screen Best Screen Play	Zia Mandviwalla for ‘Night Shift’
SDGNZ Best Director	Sam Kelly for ‘Lambs’
SDGNZ Best Editor	Jeff Hurrell for ‘Lambs’
Special Jury Prize	Richard Mans’ technical accomplishment for ‘Abiogenesis’.
Best International Film	Jannine Barnes for ‘The Wilding’

== Winners 2011 ==
Category	Winner (film / person or team)
Kodak Best Film	Jack Woon for ‘The Great Barrier’
Panavision Best Cinematographer	Nick Remy Matthews ACS for ‘The Kiss’
Best Student Film	Jonah Musitano for ‘Maurice’
StarNow Best Actor	Nicole Gulasekharam for ‘The Kiss’
Script to Screen Best Screen Play	Tammy Davis for ‘Ebony Society’
SDGNZ Best Director	Jack Woon for ‘The Great Barrier’
SDGNZ Best Editor	Lewis Albrow for ‘3 Hours’
Special Jury Prize	Peter Neville, Lucas Bone & Luke Eve for the musical score in ‘Cockroach’

== Winners 2010 ==
Category	Winner (film / person or team)
Kodak Best Film	Felicity Letcher & Rachel Lorimer for ‘This is Her’
Panavision Best Cinematographer	Jac Fitzgerald for ‘Choice Night’
Best Student Film	Zyra McAuliffe for ‘Four’
StarNow Best Actor	Cameron Rhodes for ‘Brave Donkey’
Script to Screen Best Screen Play	Kate McDermott for ‘This is Her’
SDGNZ Best Director	Mark Albiston & Louis Sutherland for ‘The Six Dollar Fifty Man’
SDGNZ Best Editor	Hayley Lake for ‘Make Me’
Special Jury Prize	Kurt Filiga for ‘Kurt-E: In My Blood’

== Winners 2009 ==
Category	Winner (film / person or team)
Kodak Best Film	Jackie van Beek for ‘Just Like the Others’
Panavision Best Cinematographer	Rewa Harre for ‘Coffee & Allah’
Best Student Film	Michael Humphrey for ‘The Big Happiness’
StarNow Best Actor	Arna-Maria Winchester from ‘Mixed Bag’
NZ Writer's Guild Best Screen Play	Waine C. Paris for ‘Kill the Alphabet’
SDGNZ Best Director	James Cunnigham for ‘Poppy’
SDGNZ Best Editor	Paul Swadel and James Cunnigham for ‘Poppy’
Special Jury Prize	James Cunningham, Stephen Fleet and Sonya Hsu-Ya Chang for animation on ‘Poppy’

== Winners 2008 ==
Category	Winner (film / person or team)
Show Me Shorts Best Film	Phill Simmonds for ‘Noise Control’
Best Student Film	Cameron Edser for ‘Animal Instincts’
Atlab Best Technical Contribution	Roseanne Liang for editing on ‘Take 3’
Panavision Special Jury Prize	Bruno du Bois for ‘Serial Killer’

== Winners 2007 ==
Category	Winner (film / person or team)
Show Me Shorts Best Film	Jeff & Phill Simmonds for ‘A Very Nice Honeymoon’
Best Student Film	Chris Payne for ‘Embers’
Atlab Best Technical Contribution	Richard Harling for cinematography on ‘Embers’
Panavision Special Jury Prize	Chris Payne for ‘Embers’

== Winners 2006 ==
Category	Winner (film / person or team)
Jameson Best Film	Jannine Barnes for ‘Ray’
CityMix Best Student Film	Kate Bradbury and Bill Morris for ‘Mad Mac and the Fat Ugly Snail
Best Technical Contribution	Suren Perera for ‘Morning Star’
Panavision Special Jury Prize	Skye Wansey for her acting in ‘A Special Talent’

== See also ==
- List of film festivals
