= IAFF =

IAFF may refer to:

- FIFA
- International Association of Fire Fighters, a labor union representing professional firefighters in the United States and Canada
- International Arts and Film Foundation, an American nonprofit foundation with an emphasis on children interested in performing and visual arts including film production
