= Malila: The Farewell Flower =

2017 film

- Film poster
- Directed by: Anucha Boonyawatana
- Written by: Anucha Boonyawatana; Waasuthep Ketpetch
- Produced by: Anucha Boonyawatana; Donsaron Kovitvanitcha; John Badalu; Juthamaj Kaewchart; Kaneenut Ruengrujira
- Starring: Sukollawat Kanarot; Anuchyd Sapanpong
- Cinematography: Chaiyapruek Chalermpornpanich
- Edited by: Chonlasit Upanigkit; Lee Chatametikool
- Music by: Chapavich Temnitikul
- Release dates: 13 October 2017 (Busan); 15 February 2018 (Thailand)
- Running time: 94 minutes
- Country: Thailand
- Language: Thai

Malila: The Farewell Flower (Thai: มะลิลา; RTGS: Malila) is a 2017 Thai drama film directed by Anucha Boonyawatana. The film premiered at Busan International Film Festival where it won the Kim Jiseok Award. It was selected as the Thai entry for the Best Foreign Language Film at the 91st Academy Awards, but it was not nominated.

== Cast ==
- Sukollawat Kanarot as Shane
- Sumret Muengput as Monk
- Anuchit Sapanpong as Pitch

== Accolades ==
Award	Category	Recipient	Result	Ref.
22nd Busan International Film Festival	Kim Jiseok Award	Malila: The Farewell Flower	Won	
41st Hong Kong Asian Film Festival	New Talent Award	Malila: The Farewell Flower	Nominated	
2017 Taipei Golden Horse Film Festival	NETPAC Award	Malila: The Farewell Flower	Won	
28th Singapore International Film Festival	Silver Screen Award	Malila: The Farewell Flower	Nominated	
28th Singapore International Film Festival	Best Director	Anucha Boonyawatana	Won	
22nd International Film Festival of Kerala	Suvarna Chakoram for Best Film	Malila: The Farewell Flower	Nominated	
22nd International Film Festival of Kerala	Rajatha Chakoram for Best Director	Anucha Boonyawatana	Won	
2018 Gothenburg Film Festival	Ingmar Bergman International Debut Award	Malila: The Farewell Flower	Nominated	
12th Asian Film Awards	Best Actor	Sukollawat Kanarot	Nominated	
12th Asian Film Awards	Best New Director	Anucha Boonyawatana	Nominated	
2018 Outfest Los Angeles LGBTQ Film Festival	Outstanding Artistic Achievement	Malila: The Farewell Flower	Won	

== See also ==
- List of submissions to the 91st Academy Awards for Best Foreign Language Film
- List of Thai submissions for the Academy Award for Best Foreign Language Film
