= Hádoc =

Portuguese documentary film festival

- Location: Leiria, Portugal
- Established: 2012

Hádoc is a documentary film festival held in Leira, Portugal. Founded in 2012, the film festival is produced by the Leira Cultural Association ecO to promote documentary cinema and create a space for debate and reflection. For celebrating the ten years of the festival, seven films were projected in the Theater Miguel Franco.

== See also ==
- List of Documentary Film Festivals
