= Little Rebels Cinema Club =

2024 Indonesian short film

- Festival release poster
- Directed by: Khozy Rizal
- Written by: Khozy Rizal
- Produced by: Hardy Yohansyah; Rayner Wijaya
- Starring: Jordan Omar; Muzakki Ramdhan; Mian Tiara; Cleo Haura
- Cinematography: Andi Moch; Palaguna
- Edited by: Khozy Rizal
- Music by: Nabil Harindyaswara
- Animation by: Hardy Yohansyah; Khozy Rizal
- Production companies: Hore Pictures; Hore Besok Libur
- Distributed by: Lights On
- Release dates: 4 December 2024 (Yogyakarta); 19 February 2025 (Berlinale)
- Running time: 17 minutes
- Country: Indonesia
- Languages: Indonesian; Makassarese

Little Rebels Cinema Club is a 2024 Indonesian-language short film written and directed by Khozy Rizal. The film set in 2008 follows the 14-year-old Doddy and his three best friends.

The film had its world premiere in December 2024 at the 19th Jogja-NETPAC Asian Film Festival in Special Screening. It was also selected in the Generation Kplus section at the 75th Berlin International Film Festival, where it had its International premiere on 19 February and won Crystal Bear for the Best Short Film in Generation Kplus section.

== Synopsis ==
In an Indonesian cinema-less town, Parepare, South Sulawesi, in 2008 a fourteen-year-old Doddy enthralls his three friends with stories of films he watched in Jakarta. He recounts a zombie film but withholds its ending, instead proposing they recreate the climax and film it.

== Cast ==
- Jordan Omar as Doddy
- Muzakki Ramdhan as Anji
- Mian Tiara as Mother
- Cleo Haura as Rizka
- Ghazy Adindra as Awal
- Al Ghazali as Reza
- Swetajaloe as Father

== Production ==
In August 2024, Little Rebels Cinema Club was announced to receive production grant from Telkomsel through its Maxstream Secinta Itu Sama Sinema initiative program.

== Release ==
The selected projects of the Secinta Itu Sama Sinema initiative program by Telkomsel and Maxstream, including Little Rebels Cinema Club, had their world premiere at the 19th Jogja-NETPAC Asian Film Festival on 4 December 2024. The film then had its international premiere on 19 February 2025, as part of the 75th Berlin International Film Festival, in Generation Kplus. It was showcased at the 24th New York Asian Film Festival in July 2025 for its New York Premiere.

== Accolades ==
Award	Date	Category	Recipient	Result	Ref.
Berlin International Film Festival	23 February 2025	Crystal Bear for the Best Short Film – Generation Kplus	Khozy Rizal	Won	
Indonesian Film Festival	20 November 2025	Best Live Action Short Film	Khozy Rizal, Hardy Yohansyah, Rayner Wijaya, and Gading Giarono	Nominated	
