= Dockanema =

DOCKANEMA is an annual international documentary film festival held in Maputo, Mozambique. The first edition was held in September 2006, and included more than 70 films. The festival is produced by the Mozambican production company Ebano Multimedia, in association with AMOCINE (Association of Mozambican Filmmakers). The second edition of DOCKANEMA took place September 14–23, 2007 in Maputo, screening more than 80 films.

== Editions ==
- 1st Dockanema: 15 – 24 September 2006; 70 films from 27 countries with 10.000 participants
- 2nd Dockanema: 14 – 23 September 2007 with 14.000 participants
- 3rd Dockanema: 12 – 21 September 2008
- 4th Dockanema: 11 – 20 September 2009
- 5th Dockanema: 10 – 19 September 2010
- 6th Dockanema: 9 – 18 September 2011
- 7th Dockanema: 14 – 23 September 2012.
