= Parts of the Heart =

2012 film directed by Paul Agusta

- Film poster
- Directed by: Paul Agusta
- Written by: Paul Agusta
- Produced by: Tommy Wisnu Pratomo; Kyo Haryanto Agusta; John Badalu
- Starring: Ade Paloh; Nazyra C. Noer; Daud Sumolang; Joko Anwar; Sunny Soon
- Cinematography: Faozan Rizal; Azzizah Imam
- Edited by: Ismail Basbeth; Muhammad Ichsan
- Music by: Jerome Kugan
- Production company: Kinekuma Pictures
- Release date: 2012
- Running time: 88 minutes
- Country: Indonesia
- Language: Indonesian

Parts of the Heart is a 2012 Indonesian drama film directed by Paul Agusta. The film was premiered in International Film Festival Rotterdam on 1 February 2012.

== Synopsis ==
It tells the story of Peter, a gay man living in Jakarta,. The film is structured into eight chapters, each chronicling a different stage of Peter's romantic journey from age 10 to 40. The narrative explores various significant moments in Peter's life, starting with his first love ("Stolen Kiss") and his initial sexual experience ("The Game Kiss"). It then delves into more challenging periods, including the death of a boyfriend ("Solace"), a breakup ("Club Virgin"), and the pressures of societal expectations ("The Last Time"). The film also examines the complexities of long-term relationships through chapters like "3" and "The Couch and the Cat." The story culminates years after Peter's marriage in "Why Isn't Peter Happy?", where he finds himself tempted by another man, leading him to re-evaluate his commitment.

== Cast ==
- Ade Paloh as Peter at 40 years old
- Nazyra C. Noer as Lisa
- Daud Sumolang as Peter at 32 years old
- Joko Anwar as Peter at 36 years old
- Sunny Soon as Ricky segment 3
- Khiva Iskak as Ricky at segment 7
- Endy Arfian as Peter at 10 years old
- Jeffrey Sirie as Jeffrey segment 3
- Rainer Oktovianus as Rudy
- Ardy Rinaldy as Peter at 15 years old
- Bunaya Yulius as Peter at 18 years old
- Elbert Powa as Peter at 24 years old
- Tuhdil Haqiqi as Peter at 28 years old
- Fachry Shyine as Banu
- Yohanes Simon Sanggor as Marko
- Rendy Wise as Jacob
- Bobby Asmoro as Alvin
- Hudy Prayoga as Tri
- Cavin Tondeo as Andy

== Production and awards ==
The film premiered at the International Film Festival Rotterdam 2012. It is a semi autobiographical movie based on Paul's experience. The idea of the film emerged after Paul's marriage in 2010. Writing began in mid-2010 and concluded at the end of 2011. The film was also screened at the Jogja-NETPAC Asian Film Festival 2012. In the same year, the film was nominated for "The Chosen Omnibus" and Daud Sumolang was nominated for "Best Actor for Chosen Omnibus" at the Piala Maya, an Indonesian film award ceremony.
