= Pete Bevacqua =

American sports and media executive

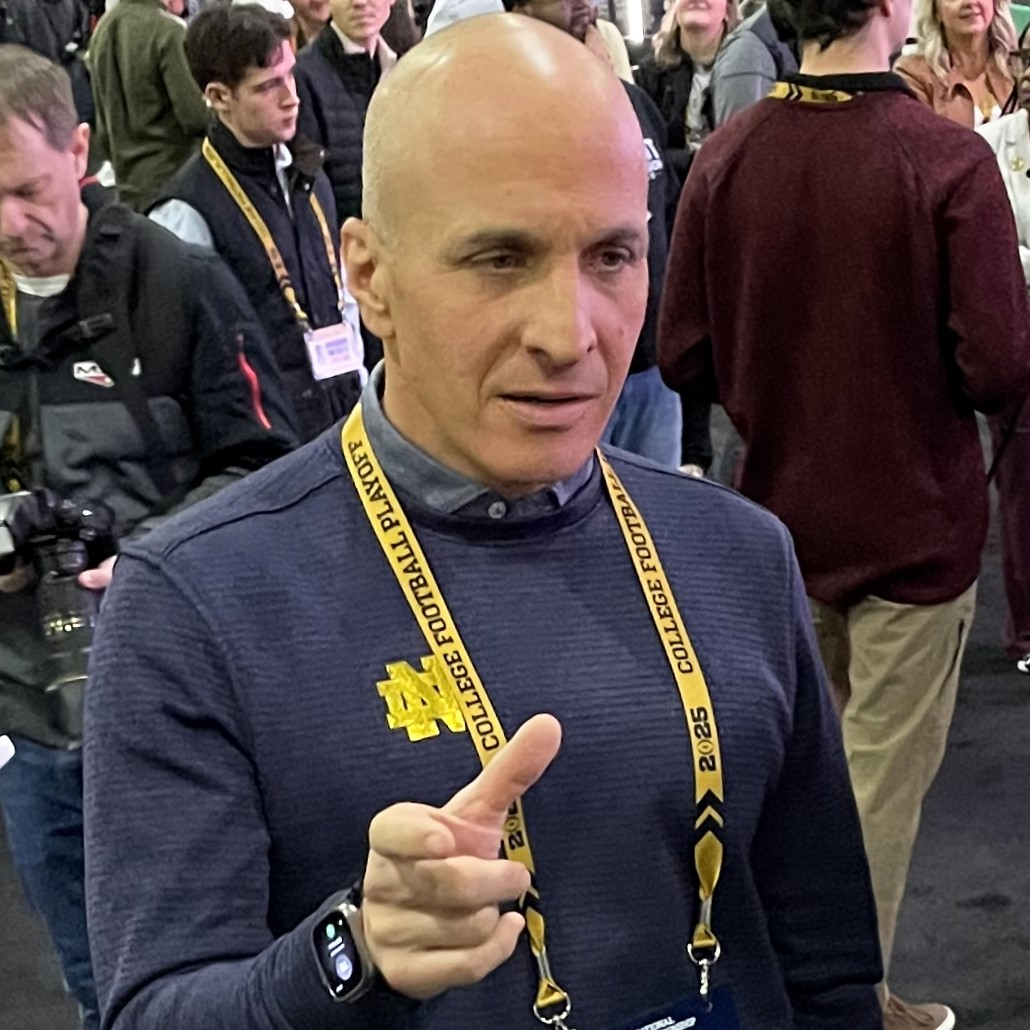
- Bevacqua talking to press ahead of the 2025 CFP National Championship.

Current position
- Title: Athletic director
- Team: Notre Dame Fighting Irish
- Conference: ACC (primary); Big Ten (men's ice hockey); Independent (football)

Biographical details
- Born: 1971 (age 54–55); Bedford, New York, U.S.
- Education: University of Notre Dame (BA); Georgetown University (JD)

Administrative career (AD unless noted)
- 2024–present: Notre Dame

Peter Paul Bevacqua (born 1971) is an American sports and media executive who is the athletic director at the University of Notre Dame. He previously was CEO of the Professional Golfers' Association of America from 2012 to 2018, and president and chairman of NBC Sports from 2018 to 2023.

== Early life ==
Bevacqua grew up in Bedford, New York. He began playing golf at a young age with his father, Arthur Bevacqua, a dentist. He attended Brunswick School in nearby Greenwich, Connecticut where he was valedictorian, senior class president and an all-league player in football, basketball and golf. He began caddying at the Bedford Golf and Tennis Club at age 10, training under head pro Walt Ronan, and continued to work summers there as a caddie and pro shop manager while attending the University of Notre Dame. He was also a walk-on punter for head football coach Lou Holtz at Notre Dame, where he graduated magna cum laude with a bachelor's degree in English in 1993. He then earned a Juris Doctor from Georgetown University, graduating cum laude in 1997.

== Professional career ==
Bevacqua began his professional career as a legal associate at Davis Polk and Wardwell LLP in New York City before joining the United States Golf Association (USGA) in 2001. He first was the USGA's in-house counsel for two years. He was then promoted to USGA's first-ever managing director of the U.S. Open. In 2009, Bevacqua was appointed as the USGA's chief business officer. Bevacqua left USGA for CAA Sports three years later, in 2012, where he was Global Head of Golf. He was appointed as the CEO of the PGA in fall 2012. He subsequently signed to two contract extensions, one in November 2013 and another in November 2017, which was due to carry him through 2024.

In October 2013, Bevacqua successfully negotiated a 15-year media rights extension through 2030 with NBC Sports for the Ryder Cup, Senior PGA Championship and PGA Professional Championship. Bevacqua was appointed as chairperson of the World Golf Foundation's board of directors' in 2015. In that role he helped the International Golf Federation reinstate golf in the Olympics, beginning with the 2016 Olympic Games in Rio de Janeiro. In August 2017, Bevacqua announced that, beginning in 2019, the PGA Championship would be conducted annually in May for the first time in 70 years.

Comcast NBCUniversal promoted Bevacqua to chairman, NBC Sports in September 2020. He was NBC Sports' third chairman. He oversaw NBC Sports’ collection of assets and platforms including NBC Sports, NBC Olympics, Golf Channel, NBC Sports Regional Networks, NBC Sports Radio, NBC Sports Digital, and two transactional sports businesses, GolfNow and SportsEngine.

In June 2023, Notre Dame president Fr. John I. Jenkins announced that Bevacqua would replace Jack Swarbrick as athletic director in early 2024. Bevacqua was a special assistant to the president for athletics before officially taking over on March 25.

A former SportsBusiness Journal “Forty Under 40” Award recipient in 2009, Bevacqua was honored with the prestigious “Sports Leadership Award” by the March of Dimes in November 2016. Bevacqua was named by Sports Business Journal as one of the 125 most influential sports executives of the last 25 years in December 2025. Bevacqua also is on the management committee of the College Football Playoffs. In June 2026, Bevacqua was appointed to the NCAA Division 1 Men's Basketball Committee where he will serve a four-year term.

He is a board member of RISE, an alliance of sports organizations that promotes racial equality. Bevacqua has been on the board of directors of Brunswick School in Greenwich, CT, and previously was a Member of the Board of Visitors with the Georgetown University Law Center.

== Personal life ==
Bevacqua and his wife, Tiffany, have one daughter and two sons.
