= Overland (film) =

Documentary film about falconry

Overland is a 2020 documentary film about falconry, directed and written by Elisabeth Haviland James and Revere La Noue. Overland follows the life of three different persons that share their passion for falconry: Giovanni Granati, a divorced father living in a farmhouse in Abruzzo; anthropologist Lauren McGough from Oklahoma, who spent two years with Kazakh nomads in western Mongolia; and an employee of the Crown Prince of Dubai, Khalifa Bin Mujren, who breeds some of the fastest falcons in the world. The documentary took five years to produce and was filmed on four continents.

Overland won the 2020 International Wildlife Film Festival and has been part of the official selection on the Santa Barbara International Film Festival, the Chagrin Documentary Film Fest, the Breck Film Festival, among other events.
