= Basri & Salma in a Never-Ending Comedy =

2023 comedy-drama short film

- Indonesian: Basri & Salma dalam Komedi yang Terus Berputar
- Directed by: Khozy Rizal
- Written by: Khozy Rizal
- Produced by: John Badalu; Sue Turley
- Starring: Arham Rizki Saputra; Rezky Chiki
- Cinematography: Andi Moch Palaguna
- Music by: Abdul Chaliq DP
- Production companies: Hore Pictures; XRM Media
- Distributed by: Lights On
- Release date: 26 May 2023 (Cannes)
- Running time: 15 minutes
- Countries: Indonesia; United States
- Language: Indonesian

Basri & Salma in a Never-Ending Comedy (Indonesian: Basri & Salma dalam Komedi yang Terus Berputar) is a 2023 short film directed, written, and edited by Khozy Rizal. It stars Arham Rizki Saputra and Rezky Chiki as the titular roles.

It had its world premiere at the 2023 Cannes Film Festival, being the first Indonesian short film to compete for the Short Film Palme d'Or.

The short film can be watched fully on Rizal's official Vimeo channel.

== Premise ==
Basri and Salma have been married for five years and feel pressured by those around them to have children, despite their busy lives with their odong-odong (kiddie ride).

== Cast ==
- Arham Rizki Saputra as Basri
- Rezky Chiki as Salma

== Release ==
Basri & Salma in a Never-Ending Comedy had its world premiere at the 2023 Cannes Film Festival on 26 May 2023, being the first Indonesian short film to compete for the Short Film Palme d'Or. The film had been featured in a number of international film festivals, including Sundance Film Festival, Clermont-Ferrand International Short Film Festival, and Busan International Film Festival.

== Accolades ==
Award / Film Festival	Date of ceremony	Category	Recipient(s)	Result	Ref.
Cannes Film Festival	27 May 2023	Short Film Palme d'Or	Khozy Rizal	Nominated	
Guanajuato International Film Festival	31 July 2023	Best International Short Fiction	Basri & Salma in a Never-Ending Comedy	Won	
Show Me Shorts	8 October 2023	Best International Film	Basri & Salma in a Never-Ending Comedy	Won	
SXSW Sydney	24 October 2023	Screen Festival Award for Best Short	Basri & Salma in a Never-Ending Comedy	Won	
AFI Fest	29 October 2023	Cinematography – Live Action Short	Andi Moch Palaguna	Special Mention	
Cork International Film Festival	16 November 2023	Grand Prix International Short Award	Basri & Salma in a Never-Ending Comedy	Won	
Palm Springs International ShortFest	23 June 2024	Best of the Festival Award	Basri & Salma in a Never-Ending Comedy	Special Mention	
