= Q! Film Festival =

LGBTQ film festival in Indonesia

- Location: Jakarta, Indonesia
- Founded: 2002
- Disestablished: 2017
- Directors: John Badalu
- Language: International
- Website: Official website (Archived)

The Q! Film Festival, held annually in the city of Jakarta in Indonesia, was Asia's largest LGBT film festival, in terms of the number of films shown. It was established in 2002, and continued until 2017. In 2003, it overtook the Jakarta International Film Festival and a number of other international ones, in the number of films shown, venues and overall length of Festival, showing 51 films in a range of venues across Jakarta. It was also the first-ever LGBT film festival to be organised in a predominantly Muslim country.

On March 4, 2017, Q! Film Festival's official Twitter feed reproduced a message sent the previous day by its founder, John Badalu, stating that the Festival would no longer continue at the present time, that it had "been a long fight and struggle to keep it going year after year" and that it "might come back one day when the time is right".

== Background ==
The Festival lasted for nine days each year, and apart from film screenings, the programme included discussions on film and literature, photo exhibitions and the launch of new books on a variety of topics dealing with gender and sexuality. Events took place across a wide range of venues, such as galleries and cultural missions. Since 2006, it became an official part of the Teddy Award at the Berlin Film Festival in Germany. Entry was free, as the Festival relied entirely on private donations, and received no government financial support or commercial sponsorship.

== History ==
Q! Film Festival was established in 2002 by 'Q-Munity', an organisation itself set up in 2001 by freelance journalists and people involved in the arts community. They wanted to improve the accessibility of performing arts and film appreciation to the widest public audience possible. It began as a group of ethnic Chinese Indonesians with an interest in contemporary Chinese cinema, whose aim was to stage a festival of Chinese films. The first Director, John Badalu, who is a freelancer in both arts management and journalism, said that, as many of the organisers were from an LGBT background, it was decided instead to screen a wider selection of high quality films from across Asia, and the rest of the world, that drew public attention to the issue of sexuality. The first festival was created entirely from the private collections of the organisers.

The first festival, known as 'Q! Film Screenings (QFS)', was held in September 2002 for 5 days, screening over 20 LGBT films. It was attended by more than 1,500 people. The intention from the beginning was to ensure free entry to films and events and to be non-commercial. In the first year, the organisers helped an AIDS organisation to distribute its research report on HIV to members of the audience. Feedback from the audience was an integral part of the Festival: responding to a questionnaire given during the screenings, most of the audience had a positive response to the event. Some even suggested to do these kinds of events on a regular basis. As a result, Q-Munity decided to make the film screening their annual activity, and planned to tour the QFS to other cities in Indonesia.

Q-Munity said that a "gay-related event in Indonesia", with a population that is 80% Muslim, is "not an easy task to do". As the first-ever LGBT film festival organised in a predominantly Muslim country, Q-Munity members faced death threats from a strong Islamic group. Tensions increased in 2009 and 2010, when members were asked by the Jakarta local government to prove that the Festival conformed to Islamic culture. The Festival organisers were also concerned that the local police had not made sufficient provision for their patrons' safety. However, they praised the police for their handling of the security for the 2013 Festival.

The Festival organisers said that the government board of censorship has itself not been supportive towards the nature of the event, whilst commercial sponsors have rejected any connection with "gay issues", partly on security grounds. It was therefore financed from the start through the savings of Q-Munity members, supplemented by non-commercial private donations and the help of foreign cultural institutions that hired out their venues free of charge. In September 2003, the Festival overtook the Jakarta International Film Festival, London Film Festival and the former Paris Film Festival in terms of number of films, number of screenings, number of venues and longer period of time, featuring 51 films. That year's Festival was attended by 4,000 people, and included many fringe events such as a painting exhibition from Agung Kurniawan, a photo exhibition by six gay and lesbian photographers, a literature talk by a New York novelist, Jamie James, three panel discussions and four international guests, from Canada, the United Kingdom, and Japan, attending the festival.

== See also ==
- List of LGBT film festivals
