= Jack Swarbrick =

American lawyer

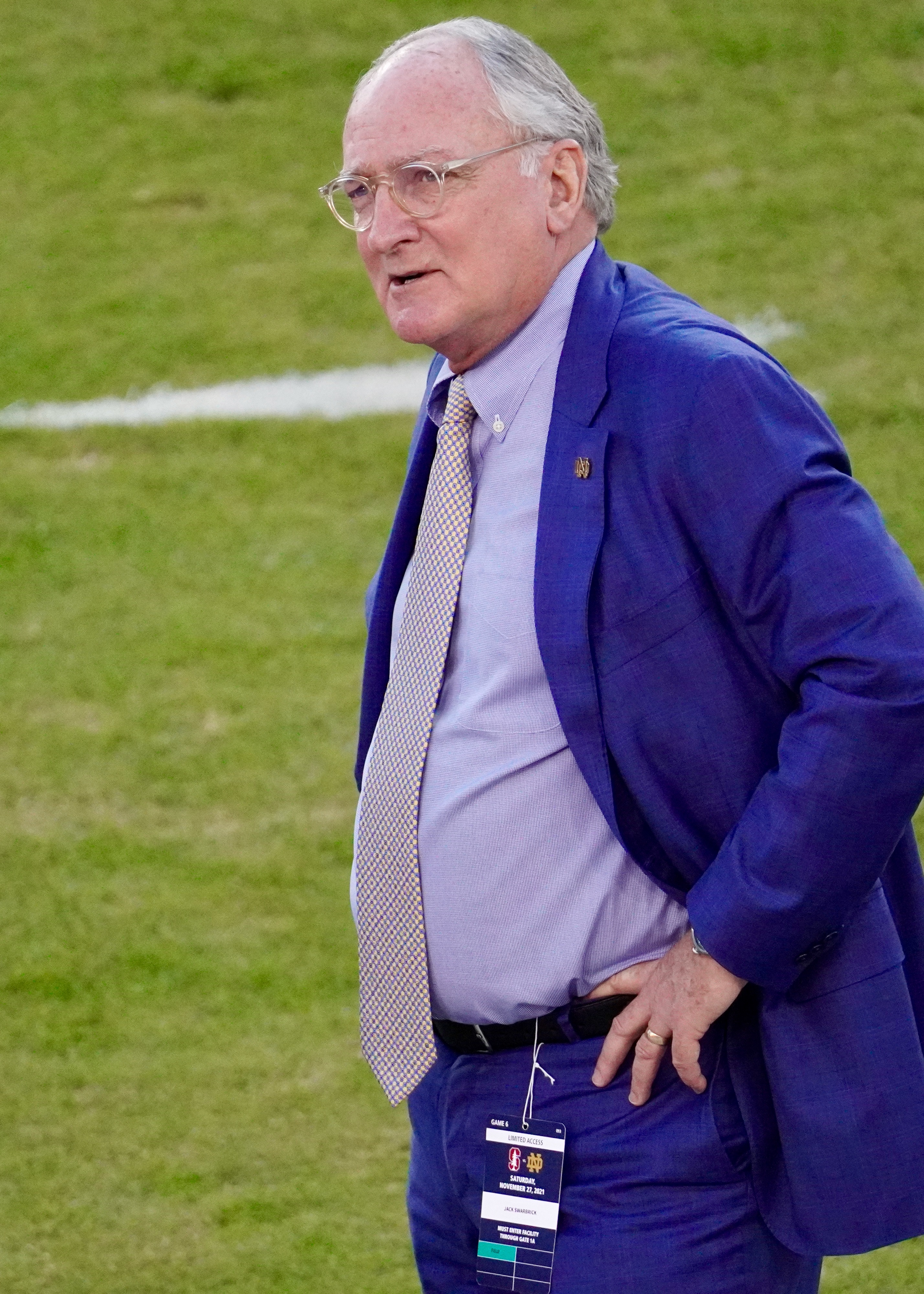

Biographical details
- Born: March 19, 1954 (age 72); Yonkers, New York, U.S.
- Education: University of Notre Dame (BA); Stanford University (JD)

Administrative career (AD unless noted)
- 2008–2024: Notre Dame

John Brian Swarbrick Jr. (born March 19, 1954) is the former athletic director at the University of Notre Dame. His appointment was announced in July 2008, replacing Kevin White, who resigned in June 2008 to take the same position at Duke University. Swarbrick served until 2024, when he was replaced by Pete Bevacqua.

== Biography ==
Swarbrick was born March 19, 1954, in Yonkers, New York, the son of John Brian and Mary Catharine (née Comey) Swarbrick. He earned an undergraduate degree (magna cum laude) in economics from Notre Dame in 1976 and a J.D. degree from Stanford in 1980. He practiced law for 28 years and was a partner in the law firm of Baker & Daniels representing USA gymnastics as general counsel, immediately prior to accepting his position at Notre Dame. From 1992 until 2001, he also served as chairman of the Indiana Sports Corp., during which time he helped convince the NCAA to relocate its headquarters to Indianapolis.

Swarbrick has never served as a sports agent, however, he did serve as counsel to Olympic gymnast Mary Lou Retton and various professional sports teams.

Swarbrick was previously considered for athletic director positions at Indiana University, Stanford University, Ohio State University, and Arizona State University In 2007, he was considered for the position of commissioner of the Big 12 Conference, and in 2002 he was a finalist for the position of NCAA president, which went to Myles Brand.

He was the vice-president of the team that successfully bid to host Super Bowl XLVI in 2012 in Indianapolis.

From 2000 to 2002, Swarbrick was CEO of LMiV, an internet firm funded partially by Emmis Communications.

Swarbrick has been a member of the Indiana bar since 1980 and is also admitted to practice in the Supreme Court and the Seventh Circuit Court of Appeals.

In June 2023, Notre Dame president Fr. John I. Jenkins announced that Swarbrick would be replaced as athletic director by NBC Sports chair Pete Bevacqua in early 2024. Bevacqua served as a special assistant to the president for athletics before officially taking over on March 25.

== Personal ==
Swarbrick is married to Kimberly, and they have four children: Kate, Connor, Cal, and Christopher.
