= Gran Paradiso Film Festival =

- Location: main location: Cogne, Italy
- Founded: 1984
- Festival date: 26–31 August
- Website: http://www.gpff.it

Gran Paradiso Film Festival is an International Nature and Environment Film Festival based in the Gran Paradiso National Park, in Italy. Originally conceived as a biannual festival, the Gran Paradiso Film Festival is one of the earliest nature film festival to be created in Italy.

The main location of the festival is the village of Cogne. Other locations in which the festival have been held include Rhêmes-Saint-Georges, Valsavarenche, Villeneuve and Ceresole Reale.

The principal festival partners are: the Presidency of the Regional Council of the Autonomous Region of Aosta Valley, The Regional Councillorship for Tourism, Sport, Commerce and Transport, Federparchi, the Gran Paradiso National Park, the City Councils of Ceresole Reale, Cogne, Rhêmes-Saint-Georges, Valsavarenche and Villeneuve.

Luisa Vuillermoz is the Artistic Directors. In past editions, Artistic Directors were Luisa Vuillermoz and Gabriele Caccialanza.

== History ==
The Gran Paradiso International Nature Film Festival - Trofeo Stambecco d'Oro was inaugurated in 1984 by Ente Progetto Natura and further expanded in the following editions.

The festival has undergone several name changes. First of all: International Nature Film Festival - Trofeo Stambecco d'Oro. The name of the 2011 edition was Trofeo Stambecco d'Oro - Valle d'Aosta International Nature Film Festival or simply International Nature Film Festival 2012 edition, the festival’s sixteenth, was Gran Paradiso International Nature Film Festival. It was a special edition, organised to celebrate the 90th birthday of the Gran Paradiso National Park, Italy’s oldest. Fabio Fazio was the special guest. The festival attracted over 6000 participants.

The XVII edition of Gran Paradiso Film Festival, which will take place in the summer of 2013, is organized by Fondation Grand Paradis.

== Awards ==
The Film Festival has two sections, International Competition and Corto Natura. The second section is dedicated to short films.

- International Competition:
  - Stambecco d'Oro Trophy, awarded by the audience
  - Stambecco d'Oro Trophy Junior Prize, awarded by a children’s jury
  - Gran Paradiso National Park Prize, awarded by the technical jury
  - Marisa Caccialanza Prize, awarded by the technical jury
  - WWF Italy Prize, awarded by the technical jury
  - LIPU - Mario Pastore Prize
- Corto Natura:
  - Corto Natura Prize
