= Encuentros del Otro Cine =

Encuentros del Otro Cine EDOC (Encounters of the Other Cinema), is a non-competitive international documentary film festival held annually in Ecuador since 2002.

The main venues are located in the cities of Quito and Guayaquil, although a good part of the program is also screened in the cities of Cuenca, Manta, Ibarra and Portoviejo. In the last edition, the festival attracted 15 thousand spectators and screened a total of 96 films from all over the world.

EDOC's program is divided into thematic sections, retrospectives, a panorama of the contemporary documentary production and the traditional section ‘How we are seen, how we see ourselves’ that shows films on Ecuador by national and international filmmakers.

Among the retrospectives screened in EDOC there is the work of Jean Rouch, the Maysles brothers, Avi Mograbi, Johan van der Keuken, Ross McElwee, Sergei Loznitsa, Nicolas Philibert, Patricio Guzmán, Joaquim Jordà, and others.

The festival's goal is to promote freedom of speech and the development of Ecuadorian documentary cinema which plays a double role: a means of artistic expression and a testimony of the social, political and cultural reality we live in. The festival also encourages a deeper understanding of other realities and cultures that are presented through the work of documentary filmmakers from all over the world.
