= Khozy Rizal =

Indonesian filmmaker (born 1995)

- Born: 9 January 1995 (age 31); Makassar, South Sulawesi, Indonesia
- Occupations: Director; writer; editor; film producer
- Years active: 2021–present

Khozy Rizal (born 9 January 1995) is an Indonesian filmmaker. He made his directorial debut with short film Makassar Is a City for Football Fans in 2021, which received Special Jury Prize at the 2021 Indonesian Film Festival. His 2023 short film Basri & Salma in a Never-Ending Comedy became the first Indonesian short film to compete for the Short Film Palme d'Or.

== Career ==
In 2021, Rizal made his directorial debut with short film Makassar Is a City for Football Fans which had its world premiere at the Minikino Film Week. It won the Jury Prize at the 2021 Sundance Film Festival Asia and was selected to screen at the 2022 Sundance Film Festival. It received Special Jury Prize at the 2021 Indonesian Film Festival. His second short film, Ride to Nowhere, had its world premiere at the 2022 Minikino Film Week and won the MFW National Competition Award.

His third short film Basri & Salma in a Never-Ending Comedy had its world premiere at the 2023 Cannes Film Festival and became the first Indonesian short film to compete for the Short Film Palme d'Or. It won the Best International Film at the 2023 Show Me Shorts, Best International Short Fiction at the 2023 Guanajuato International Film Festival, Screen Festival Award for Best Short at the 2023 SXSW Sydney, and Grand Prix International Short Award at the 2023 Cork International Film Festival. He also participated in 2023 Chanel × BIFF Asian Film Academy, co-directing The Last Night In Korea with Mohamad W. Ali, Saman Hosseinpuor, and Samara Sagynbaeva.

In 2024, his fourth short film Little Rebels Cinema Club had its world premiere at the 19th Jogja-NETPAC Asian Film Festival as a part of the "Secinta Itu Sama Sinema" program, initiated and funded by MAXstream and Telkomsel. It had its international premiere at the 75th Berlin International Film Festival, where it won the Crystal Bear for the Best Short Film for the Generation Kplus section. Rizal was also selected to participate in Berlinale Talents in 2025. In 2026, Rizal served as a jury for the Generation competition at the 76th Berlin International Film Festival. He participated in the first edition of Next Step Studio, an initiative by Cannes Film Festival's Critics' Week in 2026. He co-directed and co-wrote short film Mothers Are Mothering with Singaporean filmmaker Lam Li Shuen.

Rizal is developing his feature-length debut film I Wanna Dance with Myself, showcased at the Focus CoPro' Cinema de Demain at the 2024 Cannes Film Festival.

== Filmography ==
Year	Title	Director	Writer	Producer	Notes
2021	Makassar Is a City for Football Fans	Yes	Yes	Yes	Short
2022	Ride to Nowhere	Yes	Yes	Yes	Short
2023	Basri & Salma in a Never-Ending Comedy	Yes	Yes	No	Short
2023	The Last Night In Korea	Yes	Adapted	No	Short; Co-directed with Mohamad W. Ali, Saman Hosseinpuor, and Samara Sagynbaeva
2024	Little Rebels Cinema Club	Yes	Yes	No	Short
2025	Pink Laundry	Yes	Yes	No	Short
2026	Mothers Are Mothering	Yes	Yes	No	Short; Co-directed with Lam Li Shuen
