= Revere La Noue =

American artist, filmmaker (born 1976)

- Born: Robert James Revere La Noue; 1976; Baltimore, Maryland

Revere La Noue (born October 20, 1976) is an American artist, filmmaker and entrepreneur. He has developed extensive collections of work in art, film and experimental media. In 2010, he founded The Mascot Gallery, an online resource and store featuring a range of artwork and film about America's great icons with impressionistic depictions of their often forgotten origins. In 2012, he launched a two-story studio and exhibition space on Main Street in Durham, North Carolina.

== Life and career ==
Born in Baltimore, Maryland on the bicentennial of American Independence, La Noue was named after artisan and revolutionary Paul Revere. He earned a bachelor's degree from the College of Arts and Letters at the University of Notre Dame where he played on the lacrosse team. Graduating in 1999, he went on to complete a Master's in the Documentary Film and Video Program at Stanford University. He has also studied at the Art League, the Corcoran College of Art and Design, the Pratt Institute and the Université Catholique de l'Ouest in Angers, France.

In 2006, he moved to New York City and began working with filmmaker George Butler. He is credited as producer, creative consultant and editor on The Good Fight, a feature-length documentary about the Florida State Seminoles's football coach Bobby Bowden released in 2007. He is also credited for his field producing in the swamps of the southeastern US on another of Butler's films, the National Geographic documentary The Lord God Bird, about the recent re-discovery of the ivory-billed woodpecker.

In 2009, La Noue relocated to Durham, North Carolina where he founded the Mascot Gallery. In 2012, he opened an art studio and exhibition space on Main Street.

He is married to Elisabeth Haviland James, a documentary filmmaker.

== Paintings and prints ==
La Noue credits the beginning of his art career to living in Europe as part of Notre Dame's study abroad program in Angers, France. He studied art history and European politics at the language-intensive Université Catholique de l'Ouest, an hour's train ride from the museums of Paris. He also sought out smaller, less crowded museums where he could sit with the works of the French Impressionist painters. The sketches and preliminary paintings of Degas, Toulouse-Lautrec, Gauguin and Picasso, often just charcoal on scraps of paper, impressed upon La Noue the power of a well-executed line and subtle pairing of color.

== The Mascot Gallery ==
La Noue's best known collection is the Mascot Gallery print series, a set of figurative and impressionistic images that tell the stories of American icons. He began his work on the histories and traditions behind mascots with "The Original Fighting Irish Print Series", exploring the cultural significance of the Fighting Irish, the mascot of his undergraduate alma mater. Former head Notre Dame football coach Brian Kelly has said of "The Original Fighting Irish" that it captures the swagger and toughness that defines the school's athletic program. "It's about a humility, it's about a work ethic," Head Notre Dame lacrosse coach Kevin Corrigan has said, "...and I think he captured all of that in a painting that we really take to heart".

In 2011, La Noue was commissioned by Western Michigan University to create an entry representing their mascot, the Broncos, for the 2011 ArtPrize competition. He created a 6,500-square-foot mesh wrap around the Western Michigan University-Grand Rapids Graduate Building that depicts a fifty-foot tall herd of horses flanking a rearing central horse whose face is patterned like the western half of the state of Michigan. The original artwork for "Epic Broncos" was created using paint, charcoal and pastels before being scanned, printed on a 2-ton mesh canvas, and hung with construction lifts. La Noue interviewed the university president, athletic directors, deans, alumni, coaches and dozens of other university officials to understand the significance of the Bronco to the University. Western Michigan University described the collaboration as an opportunity for the college to "do the defining" of its own story.

== Techniques and processes ==
Much of La Noue's work mixes the formal principles of figurative and impressionistic art, with stylization inspired by film noir, comic book art and the avant-garde. He uses drawings, paintings, and photography to add texture to his film work and often studies motion picture and photography to create movement in his paintings and prints. He frequently employs a giclée printing technique to create master images from layers of microscopic digital scans of his mixed media works on paper.

== Photography ==
In 2012, La Noue opened his first private show at his Durham gallery. Lady Buenos Aires: Portrait of a City in Abstract Symmetry consisted of twenty images of Buenos Aires, Argentina, including a set of "quadrographs", or single photographs rotated and repeated to create kaleidoscopic, abstract portraits. In addition to the quadrographs, La Noue created a series distinctively layered prints portraying the city "as a woman" preparing for a night of tango ritual.

His most recent collection of quadrographs, Detroit in Abstract Symmetry, will debut at the Gerald R. Ford Presidential Museum as part of the 2012 ArtPrize competition.

== Film ==
La Noue has done creative work on large feature productions, directed and produced several short films, and regularly consults on an array of movie projects.

Alongside Martin Scorsese, he was a creative advisor on the 2011 HBO documentary The Loving Story. His short documentary Harvest was made in collaboration with the ALS Association, and continues to be used to lobby the United States Congress in support of stem cell research. Portrait of a Glitch, his short experimental documentary film, premiered nationally at the Berkeley Art Museum and Pacific Film Archive and is screened in genomics classes at the Stanford University School of Medicine.

La Noue wrote and directed a satirical documentary Stanford Banned about the controversial Leland Stanford Junior University Marching Band. The film premiered at the Ivy Film Festival and is screened annually during Stanford's reunion weekend.
