= International Arts and Film Foundation =

American non-profit

The International Arts and Film Foundation
- International Arts and Film Foundation
- Founded: 2004
- Headquarters: Tampa, Florida, US
- Location: United States, Canada
- Key people: Tony Verde, CEO
- Website: www.theiaff.org

The International Arts and Film Foundation (IAFF) is a non-profit foundation based in Tampa Bay, Florida and Reno, Nevada with an emphasis on children interested in performing and visual arts including film production.

== Film Festival ==
The IAFF collaborated with the Giffoni Film Festival in Italy to create the Imagine International Film Festival, which was held April 18–20, 2005 at the historic Royalty Theatre in Clearwater, Florida. The festival showed some 11 foreign children's movies, which had been juried by a panel of children aged 6–19 at the Giffoni Festival.
