= Mica Tedja =

Indonesian filmmaker (born 1991)

- Born: Monica Vanesa Tedja; 1991 (age 34–35); Jakarta, Indonesia
- Occupations: Director; writer; editor
- Years active: 2013–present

Monica Vanesa "Mica" Tedja (born 1991) is an Indonesian filmmaker. Their film, My Therapist Said, I am Full of Sadness won the Citra Award for Best Documentary Short Film at the 2024 Indonesian Film Festival.

== Career ==
Tedja graduated from the Multimedia Nusantara University in 2013, majoring in Visual Communication and Design. Their short film How to Make a Perfect X'Mas Eve won the Best Film presented by the Indonesian Film Directors Club at the 2013 XXI Short Film Festival. In 2015, their short film Sleep Tight, Maria, which explores the topic of women's masturbation, won the Best Short Film award at Festival Sinema Prancis, held by the Institut Français. In 2016, they directed a short film The Bird and the Bee, which earned a Special Mention in the Best Drama/Comedy Short Film category at the XXI Short Film Festival.

Tedja moved to Berlin to pursue an Master of Arts in Film Directing at the Konrad Wolf Film University of Babelsberg. Their thesis short film Dear to Me, starring Jourdy Pranata and Jerome Kurnia, was screened at the Open Doors: Shorts program at the 74th Locarno Film Festival in 2021. It received a nomination for the Best Live Action Short Film at the 2021 Indonesian Film Festival.

In 2024, they directed a documentary short film My Therapist Said, I am Full of Sadness, which had its world premiere at the Dok Leipzig. It won the Best Documentary Short Film at the 2024 Indonesian Film Festival. They created and directed a Netflix original series Night Shift for Cuties, set to release in 2026.

Tedja is developing their feature-length debut film, Dear Family. The project participated at the 2021 Southeast Asia Film Lab.

== Filmography ==
=== Film ===
Year	Title	Director	Writer	Notes
2011	How to Make a Perfect X'Mas Eve	Yes	Yes	Short
2012	The Camouflage	Yes	Yes	Short
2015	Sleep Tight, Maria	Yes	Yes	Short
2015	The Flower and the Bee	Yes	Yes	Short
2019	The Void in Between	Yes	No	Short
2021	Dear to Me	Yes	Yes	Short
2024	My Therapist Said, I am Full of Sadness	Yes	Yes	Short

=== Television ===
Year	Title	Director	Writer	Network	Notes
2026	Night Shift for Cuties	Yes	Yes	Netflix	8 episodes
