= Yogyakarta Documentary Film Festival =

Annual event in Indonesia

- Location: Yogyakarta, Indonesia
- Founded: 2002
- Language: International
- Website: ffd.or.id

The Yogyakarta Documentary Film Festival, also known as FFD Yogyakarta, is the first documentary film festival in Southeast Asia, which invites audiences and visitors to learn about the documentary genre. FFD Yogyakarta has been held regularly every year, in the second week of December, since 2002, and organized by Forum Film Dokumenter (formerly known as Komunitas Dokumenter). The festival includes a number of programs such as Competition, Screening (Perspective & Spectrum), Partial, Education (School Docs & Masterclass), and Discussion. In the competition program, FFD Yogyakarta competes in three categories, namely: Long Documentary, Short Documentary, and Student Documentary.

== Perspective ==
This program brings one main topic to be presented in the form of a series of national or international documentary film screenings. Each screening is followed by discussion or question-and-answer sessions with filmmakers or other sources related to the topic of the film.

== Spectrum ==
This program celebrates the diversity of the documentary form. Diversity is to be presented in different ways such as experimental documentary, animation, observational, and participatory video. International documentary film screenings are projected as a reference for comparison to national documentary filmmakers and film audiences. Each screening is followed by discussion or question-and-answer sessions regarding the form and aesthetic elements. Each screening and discussion session is attended by at least the filmmaker or other parties connected to the film.

== SEADoc ==
Southeast Asia Documentary Program is a collaborate program with DocNet Southeast Asia, attempting to capture the spirit of documentary filmmakers in the region.

== SchoolDoc ==
SchoolDOC after school program is a program that aims to give a new discourse for students to understand more about documentary films, both in terms of genre as well as the contents of the documentary itself. More broadly, the program also aims to provide media awareness to students.

The program activities consist of documentary film screenings for kids and students (elementary and junior-high), cinema literacy, critics' workshops for senior high school and college students, student communal juries (senior high school), and documentary critic competitions for senior high school students.

== Masterclass ==
The Masterclass program is held as an event for Indonesian documentary filmmakers to increase their knowledge and awareness of the different approaches they could use in their filmmaking. The goal is to intensify Indonesian documentary filmmakers' proficiency and extend the scope of the non-fiction genre. The program runs as a forum that consists of young documentary filmmakers and a group of international documentary experts/filmmakers to meet, discuss, and share knowledge about the development of documentary films. Previous festival speakers include Mark Achbar (Canada), Peter Wintonick (Canada), Michael Sheridan (USA), Anand Patwardhan (India), Curtis Levy (Australia), Leonard Retel Helmrich (Netherlands), Petr Lom (Czechia), Ditsi Carolino (Philippines), Marianna Yarovskaya (USA), and Katinka Van Hareen (Netherlands).

== Competition ==
The competition program is designed to appreciate the best documentary films produced in Indonesia during each year. It is expected to be a quality standard for Indonesian documentary films and a place for filmmakers to compete with each other in a positive way. The jury consists of national and international documentary professionals, scholars, and critics. The competition is divided into three categories, namely Short Documentary Category, Feature Length Documentary and Student.

== Awards ==
The Yogyakarta Documentary Film Festival has received award in the following categories:

- Best Feature-Length Indonesian Documentary Film (Film Dokumenter Indonesia Terbaik Kategori Panjang)
- Best Short Indonesian Documentary Film (Film Dokumenter Indonesia Terbaik Kategori Pendek)
- Best Student Documentary Film (Film Dokumenter Indonesia Terbaik Kategori Pelajar)
- Yogyakarta Documentary Film Festival Award for The Youth Jury's Favorite Film (Film Dokumenter Terfavorit Pilihan Juri Komunal)
