= Paul Agusta =

Indonesian American actor and director

Paul Fauzan Agusta (born 1 September 1980) is an Indonesian American actor and director.

== Personal life ==
Paul was born in Kampung Melayu, Jakarta on 1 September 1980. He is the child from Leon Agusta, Indonesian Poet and Margaret Rose Glade, an indonesian journalist and feminist. Since he was 8 year old, he lovesd going to the theater with his mother and his experience watching The NeverEnding Story made him realize his ambition to became a director. He was living in United States before coming back in 2003 to Indonesia. He was living in the United States before returning to Indonesia in 2003. His family was accepting of his sexuality. When he came out to his mother as gay, she responded by identifying herself as bisexual. At the Bottom of Everything is a film he also directed as part of his actualization, a process undertaken while he was experiencing bipolar disorder that almost led him to suicide. In June 2010, he was married and this marriage was part of Parts of the Heart, especially where his spouse was died.

== Career ==
His full-length feature film debut was Kado The Anniversary Gift, an Indonesian slasher film released in 2008. Then, he continued his work on At the Bottom of Everything, an Indonesian drama film depicting bipolar disorder, in 2010. The movie premiered at the International Film Festival Rotterdam and was partly funded by the Hubert Bals Fund. On the next year, he directed music documentary, The Songstress and the Seagull which depict of Kartika Jahja and Vina Panduwinata. On the same year, he directed second music documentary titled Semalam di Rumah Bonita: A Concert Film that depicted Bonita & The Hus Band, indonesian music group

On 2012, he directed Parts of the Heart, Indonesian drama film that depict mostly about his life as an Indonesian gay man. The film premiered at the International Film Festival Rotterdam 2012. It was got nominated in Golden Hanoman Award at Jogja-NETPAC Asian Film Festival 2012 where it was also screened. The film also received a nomination in the chosen omnibus category at the Piala Maya 2012.
