= List of film festivals in the United States =

This is a list of film festivals that take place (or took place) in the United States.

== Alabama ==
Name	Est.	City	Notes	Ref
Black Warrior Film Festival	2013	Tuscaloosa	Staged by the University of Alabama	
Fairhope Film Festival		Fairhope		
George Lindsey UNA Film Festival		Florence	Staged by the University of North Alabama	
Lanett City Film Festival	2017	Lanett		
Montgomery Film Festival	2009	Montgomery		
Sidewalk Film Festival	1999	Birmingham		
Troy International Film Festival		Troy		
Yellowhammer Film Festival		multiple locations	High school and college student films	

== Alaska ==
Name	Est.	City	Notes	Ref
Anchorage International Film Festival	2001	Anchorage	Largest film festival in the state of Alaska	

== Arizona ==
Name	Est.	City	Notes	Ref
Arizona International Film Festival	2023	Tucson		
Filmstock Film Festival	2011	multiple locations		
International Horror and Sci-Fi Film Festival	2005	Tempe		
Loft Film Fest	2010	Tucson	The Loft Film Fest is dedicated to showcasing the best independent, foreign and classic films, as well as celebrating the work of established and emerging directors, writers, producers and actors.	
Monument Valley Film Festival	2007	Kayenta		
Phoenix Film Festival	2000	Phoenix		
Rock the Canyon	2009	Shonto		
Sedona International Film Festival	1994	Sedona		
Scottsdale International Film Festival	2010	Scottsdale	Annual, international film festival held in November. Year-round Screenings and events supporting the Festival and international filmmakers.	
Tombstone Western Film Festival and Symposium	2001	Tombstone		
Tucson Film & Music Festival	2005	Tucson		

== Arkansas ==
Name	Est.	City	Notes	Ref
Bentonville Film Festival	2015	Bentonville	Held annually in May and focused on diversity in film, specifically women and under represented minority filmmakers.	
Hot Springs Documentary Film Festival	1992	Hot Springs		
Little Rock Film Festival	2006	Little Rock	Held annually in the beginning of June. This southern film festival features narrative film, documentary films, short film, panels, and unforgettable events.	

== California ==
Name	Est.	City	Notes	Ref
168 Film Festival	2003	Los Angeles	Speed filmmaking competition and festival. Entries accepted from anywhere in the world. Held annually in April.	
Action On Film International Film Festival	2005	Monrovia	Started as part of the World Martial Arts Trade Show and International Championships.	
Asian World Film Festival	2015	Los Angeles	International; held annually in October–November.	
Atheist Film Festival	2009	San Francisco	Annual event from 2009-2014; dedicated to films related to atheism.	
Bel Air Film Festival	2008	Los Angeles	An international festival held annually in November.	
Berlin & Beyond Film Festival	1996	San Francisco	German-language film festival outside of Europe, held annually in January.	
Big Bear Lake International Film Festival	2000	Big Bear Lake	Committed to presenting emerging talents of independent filmmakers and screenwriters, held annually in September.	
BraveMaker Film Festival	2019	Redwood City, California	Elevate brave stories for justice, diversity and inclusion.	
Burbank International Film Festival	2009	Burbank		
CAAMFest	2012	San Francisco	The nation's largest showcase for new Asian American and Asian films	
Coronado Island Film Festival	2016	Coronado Island	Held annually in November in the resort city across the bay from downtown San Diego.	
COLCOA French Film Festival	1997	Los Angeles, California	Held annually in November at the Directors Guild of America in Hollywood.	
Dances With Films	1998	Los Angeles	The festival of unknowns (i.e. no celebrities)	
DaVinci International Film Festival	2017	Los Angeles	International; held annually in September.	
Downtown Los Angeles Film Festival	2008	Los Angeles		
Frameline Film Festival	1997	San Francisco	Frameline Film Festival produces the San Francisco International LGBT Film Festival which is the oldest ongoing film festival devoted to LGBT programming.	
Horrible Imaginings Film Festival	2009	San Diego and Santa Ana	Annually in September.	
Idyllwild International Festival of Cinema	2009	Idyllwild-Pine Cove	Held annually in January. An independent film festival	
International Black Women's Film Festival	2001	San Francisco	Exhibiting films by and/or featuring Black women from around the world in non-stereotypical roles.	
LA's Rich and Successful Film Festival	2021	Los Angeles	Held annually in September at Grauman's Egyptian Theatre. Premiere short film showcase for rising Los Angeles-based talent.	
L.A. Comedy Shorts Film Festival	2009	Los Angeles	Held annually in the spring. Host of the L.A. Comedy Scripts screenplay competition.	
Los Angeles Asian Pacific Film Festival	1983	Los Angeles	Premiere showcase for the best and brightest of Asian Pacific American and international cinema in Los Angeles. Held annually in May.	
Los Angeles Film Festival	1995	Los Angeles	Held annually in June. Shows independent, feature, documentary and short films, as well as music videos.	
Mill Valley Film Festival	1977	Mill Valley	Held annually in early October. It is organized by the California Film Institute.	
Mods & Rockers Film Festival	1999	Los Angeles	Celebration of rock music culture films.	
Nevada City Film Festival	2001	Nevada City		
New Media Film Festival	2009	Los Angeles	Annual film festival that brings together the work of established and emerging New Media Content Creators and video artists around the world.	
Newport Beach Film Festival	1999	Newport Beach	Founded in 1999, the Newport Beach Film Festival has evolved into a multicultural event, attracting over 40,000 attendees to Orange County.	
Noor Iranian Film Festival	2007	Los Angeles	Dedicated to the cinema of Iran	
Oceanside International Film Festival	2009	Oceanside, San Diego County	Held annually in August through 2020. Held annually in February since 2021.	
Palm Springs Festival of Festivals	2001	Palm Springs		
Palm Springs International Film Festival	1989	Palm Springs		
Sacramento French Film Festival	2002	Sacramento	For ten days in June the Main Event celebrates the artistic, cultural, social and historical values of French film. The Winter Shorts Fest (since 2008) presents the César Award-nominated short films. The Minifest (since 2014) is a one-day miniature festival held in the fall. The Virtual Cinema presents first-run films and our festival events.	
San Diego International Film Festival	2001	San Diego’s Gaslamp Quarter and La Jolla	Held in October, the festival showcases international narrative features, shorts and documentaries in various categories including Native American, social justice and military.	
San Diego Latino Film Festival	1993	San Diego		
San Diego French Film Festival	2021	San Diego	Held in June, the festival presents francophone movies. It is organized by the Alliance Francaise San Diego	
San Diego Film Week	2017	San Diego’s Balboa Park	Held in February–March, the festival showcases local narrative features, short films, and documentaries for film.	
San Francisco Frozen Film Festival	2006	San Francisco	Special interest, Independent.	
San Francisco Green Film Festival	2011	San Francisco		
San Francisco Independent Film Festival	1998	San Francisco		
San Francisco International Asian American Film Festival	1982	San Francisco	Dedicated to Asian and Asian-American films.	
San Francisco International Film Festival	1957	San Francisco		
San Francisco Jewish Film Festival	1980	San Francisco	SFJFF is a year-round media arts organization that promotes awareness, appreciation and pride in the diversity of the Jewish people.	
San Luis Obispo International Film Festival	1993	San Luis Obispo	Held annually in March.	
Santa Barbara International Film Festival	1985	Santa Barbara		
Sonoma International Film Festival	1996	Sonoma	SIFF takes place every March in the United States’ Wine Country, 45 minutes north of San Francisco.	
TCM Classic Film Festival	2010	Los Angeles	A celebration of classic films presented by Turner Classic Movies.	
WYSIWYG Film Festival	1999	San Francisco	Christian film festival (What You See Is What You Get)	
Zero Film Festival	2007	Los Angeles	Film festival exclusive to self-financed filmmakers.	

== Colorado ==
Name	Est.	City	Notes	Ref
Boulder International Film Festival	2004	Boulder		
Crested Butte Film Festival	2011	Crested Butte	Held annually in the last week of September supporting action and change together.	
Denver Film Festival	1978	Denver	Held annually in November.	
Denver Underground Film Festival	1997	Denver	Held annually in May.	
Durango Independent Film Festival	2005	Durango	Held annually the first week of March.	
Festivus Film Festival	2006	Denver	Ended in 2013	
Mile High Horror Film Festival	2010	Denver	Independent horror films from around the world.	
Moondance International Film Festival	2000	Boulder	Film writers, filmmakers and film score composers who, through their creative work, actively increase awareness, provide multiple viewpoints, address complex social issues, and strengthen ties between international audiences.	
Rocky Mountain Women's Film Festival	1987	Colorado Springs	Held annually in early November showcasing films made by women. The festival features a mix of documentary, short and narrative films.	
Telluride Film Festival	1974	Telluride	Only 40 films are admitted each year.	

== Connecticut ==
Name	Est.	City	Notes	Ref
Cinefest Fairfield	2005	Fairfield		
Connecticut LGBTQ Film Festival	1988	Hartford		
Greenwich International Film Festival	2015	Greenwich		
Litchfield Hills Film Festival	2006	Kent, New Milford, Torrington		
New England Festival of Ibero American Cinema	2010	New Haven		
Film Fest New Haven	1995	New Haven		
New Haven Documentary Film Festival	2014	New Haven		
New Haven Underground Film Festival		multiple locations		

== Delaware ==
Name	Est.	City	Notes	Ref
First State Film Festival	2019	Wilmington		
Rehoboth Beach International Film Festival	1998	Rehoboth Beach		

== Florida ==
Name	Est.	City	Notes	Ref
American Black Film Festival	2005	South Beach		
BizarroLand Film Festival	2016	Orlando	Showcasing "the most aggressively bizarre midnight, underground, outsider, and weirdo cinema of all genres." (Until January 2022 it was known as Sick 'n' Wrong Film Festival)	
Borscht Film Festival	2003	Miami		
Florida Film Festival	1992	Maitland	Includes narrative and documentary features and shorts, animation, midnight movies, educational forums, and special events.	
Fort Lauderdale International Film Festival	1986	Fort Lauderdale	Held annually in November, presented by the Broward County Film Society.	
Gasparilla International Film Festival	2007	Tampa Bay		
Human Rights Watch Film Festival	1989	Miami		
India International Film Festival of Tampa Bay	2010	Tampa	Held annually. Feature films, short films, and documentaries that are produced by Indians, films with Indian actors or actresses, or films with Indian themes.	
Israel Film Festival	1982	Miami		
Jacksonville Film Festival	2003	Jacksonville	Held annually in February. International Film Festival	
Love Your Shorts Film Festival	2011	Sanford	Held around Valentine's Day. The festival screens only short films under 30 minutes in length.	
L-DUB Film Festival		Lake Worth		
Miami 48-Hour Film Project	2005	Miami		
Miami International Film Festival	1983	Miami		
Miami Jewish Film Festival	1996	Miami	Films with Jewish themes; held annually in January.	
Miami Short Film Festival	2002	Miami	Short film festival held annually in mid-November.	
Orlando Film Festival	2006	Orlando	Held annually in October/November.	
OutLove International Film Festival	2020	Fort Myers		
Palm Beach International Film Festival	1996	Palm Beach		
Sarasota Film Festival	1998	Sarasota	Annual, international celebration of film and filmmaking held in April. Year-round arts nonprofit hosting education programs and filmmaking academies.	
Sicilian Film Festival	2006	Miami		
Sunscreen Film Festival	2006	St. Petersburg	Organized and presented by the St. Petersburg-Clearwater Film Society.	
Tallahassee Film Festival	2008	Tallahassee		
Tampa Bay Jewish Film Festival	2006	Tampa		
Tampa International Gay and Lesbian Film Festival	1990	Tampa		
Through Women's Eyes International Film Festival	1999	Sarasota	Films by and about women. Proceeds from TWE go to the UN Women's Gulf Coast Chapter, which provides education and awareness for gender equity and women's issues worldwide.	

== Georgia ==
Name	Est.	City	Notes	Ref
African Film Festival Atlanta	2020	Atlanta	Georgia’s first homegrown African film festival powered by African Film and Arts Foundation, dedicated to showcasing films by and about people of African descent and celebrating the diversity of African and Diaspora cinema.	
Atlanta Film Festival	1976	Atlanta	Occurring every spring, the festival shows a diverse range of independent films, with special attention paid to women-directed films, LGBTQ films, Latin American films, Black films and films from the American Southeast.	
Atlanta International Documentary Film Festival	2006	Atlanta	Focused on storytelling through various documentary styles and bringing together local and international filmmakers.	
Atlanta International Film Festival	1968	Atlanta	Defunct	
Atlanta Jewish Film Festival	2000	Atlanta		
BronzeLens Film Festival	2009	Atlanta	Annual film festival in late August designed to promote Atlanta as the new film mecca for people of color, to showcase films and to provide networking opportunities that will develop the next generation of filmmakers.	
Campus MovieFest	2000	Atlanta		
CinErotic FilmFest	2010	Atlanta	Debuted February 12–14, 2010; celebrates sex-positive, diverse and empowering erotic cinema and performance by amateurs, independent artists and the avant-garde.	
Out on Film	1987	Atlanta		
The American Good Film Festival	2021	Atlanta	Annual international film festival hosted by Esperanto-USA featuring films under 5 minutes long made entirely in the constructed language Esperanto with kickoff events and red carpet premieres in Atlanta, GA.	

== Hawaii ==
Name	Est.	City	Notes	Ref
Big Island Film Festival	2006	Kohala		
Hawaii International Film Festival	1981	Honolulu	Held annually in the fall for two weeks. HIFF states that it "is dedicated to the advancement of understanding and cultural exchange among the peoples of Asia, the Pacific and North America through the medium of film."	
Honolulu Rainbow Film Festival	1989	Honolulu		
Maui Film Festival	2000	Maui		

== Idaho ==
Name	Est.	City	Notes	Ref
Lakedance International Film Festival	2006	Sandpoint	Defunct	
SpudFest	2004	Driggs	Defunct	

== Illinois ==
Name	Est.	City	Notes	Ref
Asian Animation Film Festival	2006	Chicago	Held for one year only.	
Big Dam Film Festival	2006	Quincy	Has not been held since 2013.	
Chicago International Children's Film Festival	1983	Chicago	Festival of films for kids and youth in North America. Held annually in late October for 10 days.	
Chicago International Documentary Film Festival	2003	Chicago		
Chicago International Film Festival	1965	Chicago	Held annually in October.	
Chicago International REEL Shorts Festival		Chicago		
Chicago Latino Film Festival	1985	Chicago		
Chicago Outdoor Film Festival	1999	Chicago		
Chicago Palestine Film Festival	2001	Chicago		
Chicago Underground Film Festival	1994	Chicago		
Ebertfest	1997	Champaign	Founded by film critic Roger Ebert.	
Geneva Film Festival	2007	Geneva		
Imago Film Festival	2005	Elgin		
Insect Fear Film Festival	1984	Champaign-Urbana		
Midwest Independent Film Festival		Chicago		
Naperville Independent Film Festival	2008	Naperville	Annual film festival featuring the work of independent filmmakers.	
Reeling: The Chicago LGBTQ+ International Film Festival	1981	Chicago		
Route 66 Film Festival	2002	Springfield		

== Indiana ==
Name	Est.	City	Notes	Ref
Heartland International Film Festival	1991	Indianapolis	The festival is an 11-day event that regularly includes over 100 independent filmmakers and showcases more than 200 films. By 2020, it had awarded over $3 million to independent filmmakers from around the world.	
Indy Film Fest	2004	Indianapolis		
Indianapolis Jewish Film Festival	2014	Indianapolis		
Notre Dame Queer Film Festival	2004	Notre Dame		

== Iowa ==
Name	Est.	City	Notes	Ref
Cedar Rapids Independent Film Festival	2001	Cedar Rapids	Held annually the first full non-Easter weekend in April.	
Hardacre Film Festival	1997	Tipton		
Landlocked Film Festival	2007	Iowa City		

== Kansas ==
Name	Est.	City	Notes	Ref
Kansas International Film Festival	2001	Overland Park		
Tallgrass Film Festival	2003	Wichita	This four-day festival, held in October, accepts independent short and feature submissions from all over the world.	

== Kentucky ==
Name	Est.	City	Notes	Ref|-
Fright Night Film Fest	2005	Louisville		

== Louisiana ==
Name	Est.	City	Notes	Ref
Baton Rouge Jewish Film Festival	2007	Baton Rouge	Celebrates the diversity of the Jewish experience through film by presenting universal themes against the backdrop of Jewish traditions and characters.	
Louisiana Film Prize	2012	Shreveport	Short films shot in North Louisiana compete for $50k.	
New Orleans Film Festival	1989	New Orleans	Frequently referred to as Cannes on the Mississippi.	
Overlook Film Festival	2017	New Orleans		
Red Stick International Animation Festival	2005	Baton Rouge		
Third Street Film Festival	2011	Baton Rouge		

== Maine ==
Name	Est.	City	Notes	Ref
Bangor Film Festival	2007	Bangor		
Camden International Film Festival	2005	Camden, Rockport, Rockland		
Maine International Film Festival	1998	Waterville		
Maine Silent Film Festival	2023	Bucksport, Maine, Waterville, Maine		
Sanford International Film Festival	2014	Sanford		

== Maryland ==
Name	Est.	City	Notes	Ref
Baltimore International Black Film Festival	2012	Baltimore	Platform for films by African Americans, members of the African Diaspora and the Same Gender Loving - Bisexual and Transgender (SGLBT) community	
AFI Docs	2003	Silver Spring (plus Washington, DC)		
Bastard Film Encounter	2013	Baltimore		
Johns Hopkins Film Festival	1997	Baltimore		
Maryland Film Festival	1999	Baltimore	Held annually for 4 days each May. Includes 40+ new features and 50+ new shorts, as well as a favorite film selected and hosted by MFF board member John Waters.	

== Massachusetts ==
Name	Est.	City	Notes	Ref
Arlington International Film Festival	2010	Arlington	The festival focuses on Multicultural awareness and stresses also the importance of the artistic and educational value of films from all around the world.	
Berkshire International Film Festival	2005	Great Barrington		
Boston Asian American Film Festival	2008	Boston	Held annually, focuses on Asian-American films.	
Boston Film Festival	1984	Boston	Annually showcasing feature films, documentaries and shorts in September.	
Boston International Film Festival	2003	Boston		
Boston Science Fiction Film Festival	1972	Boston	Focuses on science fiction.	
Boston Underground Film Festival	1998	Boston		
Cape Cod International Film Festival	2014	Chatham	Annual high-curation-standard global boutique festival, early-mid October on Cape Cod.	
Independent Film Festival Boston	2003	Boston		
Martha's Vineyard African American Film Festival	2002	Martha's Vineyard		
Martha's Vineyard Film Festival	2001	Chilmark	Held annually in March, but also includes summer and winter film series, and special events at other times of the year. Community-oriented, featuring action/activism-inspiring films. Filmmakers/film subjects regularly speak after screenings.	
Martha's Vineyard International Film Festival	2006	Martha's Vineyard	Held annually in early September. Festival is hosted by the Martha's Vineyard Film Society	
Merrimack Valley Christian Film Festival	1993	Lawrence	Focuses on Christian films.	
Nantucket Film Festival	1996	Nantucket	Held annually in June. Dedicated to promoting cultural awareness and appreciation of the art of screenwriting in the world of cinema. Has both film and screenplay competitions.	
New Bedford Film Festival	2024	New Bedford		
Provincetown International Film Festival	1999	Provincetown		
Roxbury Film Festival	1998	Boston	Showcase films that celebrate people of color.	
Woods Hole Film Festival	1991	Woods Hole		

== Michigan ==
Name	Est.	City	Notes	Ref
Ann Arbor Film Festival	1961	Ann Arbor	Film festival showcasing experimental and independent film in North America. Held annually in late March.	
Capital City Film Festival	2011	Lansing	Celebrates and promotes filmmakers with an emphasis on Michigan-made, homegrown talent. A four-day festival taking place in venues across Lansing.	
Detroit Windsor International Film Festival	2008	Detroit	2008-2012 (ended)	
Emberlight International Film Festival	2021	Ironwood	One component of Emberlight, an annual arts festival in the western Upper Peninsula of Michigan. Filmmakers, painters, dancers, musicians and writers alike can draw inspiration from each other as well as the beauty of the pristine nature of the region.	
Traverse City Film Festival	2005	Traverse City	Annual festival co-founded by filmmaker Michael Moore.	

== Minnesota ==
Name	Est.	City	Notes	Ref
.EDU Film Festival		Minneapolis	Student film screenings; equipment demos; roundtables with film directors, writers, and producers; and meet-and-greets with post secondary institutions that feature strong film/video production programs.	
Highway 61 Film Festival	2011	Pine City	Held annually in mid-October, its purpose is to recognize and honor filmmakers in East Central Minnesota and other American cities up and down Old US Highway 61.	
Minneapolis St. Paul International Film Festival	1983	Minneapolis-St. Paul	Held annually in the spring. Showcases more than 200 films from around the world. Presented by The Film Society of Minneapolis St. Paul.	

== Mississippi ==
Name	Est.	City	Notes	Ref
Crossroads Film Festival	2000	Jackson	Held annually in April for three days. Second oldest film festival in Mississippi. Features independent films, live music, workshops, and prizes.	
Magnolia Independent Film Festival	1997	Starkville	Held annually in February for one weekend. First film festival in Mississippi. Short films, experimental films, and many special events in which filmmakers participate.	
Oxford Film Festival	2004	Oxford	Annually in March. Dozens of documentary and narrative film shorts, with a selected narrative feature to anchor the festival. Events throughout the weekend are held for filmmakers and for the general public.	

== Missouri ==
Name	Est.	City	Notes	Ref
QFest St. Louis	2008	St. Louis	Showcase of LGBTQ+-themed films	
Robert French Film Festival	2009	St. Louis	Features classic and contemporary French films.	
Springfield and the Ozarks 48-Hour Film Festival	2006	Springfield	SATO48 challenges filmmakers to create a short film entirely from scratch over the course of 48 hours.	
St. Louis International Film Festival	1992	St. Louis	Cinema St. Louis engages the St. Louis region through educational programs, cultural connectivity, and curated film exhibitions.	
True/False Film Fest	2003	Columbia	Features nonfiction films.	

== Montana ==
Name	Est.	City	Notes	Ref
Big Sky Documentary Film Festival	2003	Missoula		
International Wildlife Film Festival	1977	Missoula		
Montana International Film Festival	2018	Billings		

== Nebraska ==
Name	Est.	City	Notes	Ref
Omaha Film Festival		Omaha		
Prairie Lights Film Festival		Grand Island		
Wildcat Spirit Short Film Festival		Wayne	Student short films	

== Nevada ==
Name	Est.	City	Notes	Ref
CineVegas	1999	Paradise	Defunct	
The Comedy Festival	1995	Las Vegas	Defunct	
The Dam Short Film Festival	2005	Boulder City		
Las Vegas Film Festival		Las Vegas		
Las Vegas International Film and Screenwriting Festival	2015	Las Vegas	First established as the Las Vegas International Film and Screenplay Competition (2015–2018)	
Las Vegas Queer Arts Film Festival		Las Vegas		
Nevada International Film Festival		Las Vegas		
Nevada Women's Film Festival	2015	Las Vegas		
PollyGrind Film Festival	2010	Las Vegas	Defunct	

== New Hampshire ==
Name	Est.	City	Notes	Ref
New Hampshire Film Festival	2001	Portsmouth	Founded in 2001 in Derry, New Hampshire (initially as the New Hampshire Film Expo), the festival moved to Portsmouth, New Hampshire in 2004. Held annually in October.	
New Hampshire High School Short Film Festival	2008	Concord, Manchester		
New Hampshire Jewish Film Festival		multiple locations		

== New Jersey ==
Name	Est.	City	Notes	Ref
Garden State Film Festival	2015	Asbury Park	Founded to promote the art of filmmaking on all levels by showcasing a wide variety of film, video and animated works as well as provide educational programs in the creative arts to the public by industry leaders.	
Golden Door Film Festival	2011	Jersey City	Held annually, usually in the fall	
Montclair Film Festival	2012	Montclair	An annual, community-based film festival that showcases filmmakers from a variety of countries	
Newark Black Film Festival	1974	Newark	Held annually and highlighting the African American experience and African diaspora	
New Jersey Film Festival	1982	New Brunswick	Held annually at Rutgers University–New Brunswick	
Northeast Film Festival	2013	Teaneck	Features both US and international films with competition in feature length and short fiction as well as documentaries and student films. Held annually in September.	
Teaneck International Film Festival	2006	Teaneck	Recurring theme “Activism: Making Change”.	
Thomas Edison Film Festival	1981	travelling	Originally the Black Maria Film Festival, based at New Jersey City University, now Kean Jersey City, in Jersey City, TEFF generally screens shorts film in a variety of genres with topics addressing social and environmental issues	

== New Mexico ==
Name	Est.	City	Notes	Ref
Duke City Shootout	2000	Albuquerque		
Filmstock Film Festival	2009			
Santa Fe Film Festival	1999	Santa Fe		
Santa Fe International Film Festival	2009	Santa Fe		
Taos Talking Pictures Film Festival	1995	Taos		
Way OUT West Film Fest	2003	Albuquerque, Santa Fe	LGBT films	
The White Sands International Film Festival	2008	Alamogordo, Las Cruces		

== New York ==
Name	Est.	City	Notes	Ref
ACE Film Festival	2006	New York City	Showcase of American independent film and media. Held annually in September.	
Brooklyn Horror Film Festival	2016	Brooklyn	A New York City festival dedicated to showing the best in independent horror films.	
Chinatown Film Festival	2005	Chinatown, New York City	Asian film	
Film @ Downtown Urban Arts Festival	2015	New York City	Showcases new short film from new and emerging independent filmmakers from United States and around the world.	
Gotham Screen Film Festival & Screenplay Contest	2007	New York City	Showcase of new American and international cinema, with a competitive screenplay contest.	
Hamptons International Film Festival	1993	East Hampton		
Havana Film Festival New York	2000	New York City	Competitive film festival showcasing Latin American cinema with a special focus on Cuba and its film industry. Partner of International Festival of New Latin American Cinema in Havana, Cuba.	
High Falls Film Festival	2001	Rochester	High Falls Film Festival celebrates the work of women filmmakers. It includes features, documentaries, shorts, children's and young adult programs, programs in film education and student film making competitions.	
JAPAN CUTS: The New York Festival of Contemporary Japanese Cinema	2007	New York City	North America's biggest festival of contemporary Japanese cinema. Held annually in July.	
Margaret Mead Film Festival	1976	New York City	Showcase for international documentaries in the United States. Held annually in November at the American Museum of Natural History in New York City.	
Native American Film and Video Festival	1979	New York City	Biannual festival held at the Smithsonian National Museum of the American Indian featuring indigenous works from across the Americas	
New York Asian Film Festival	2002	New York City	Features North American premieres and classic titles from Asian cinemas, especially horror, action and martial arts genres.	
New York City Independent Film Festival	2009	New York City		
New York Film Festival	1962	New York City	One of North America's oldest film festivals.	
New York International Children's Film Festival	1997	New York City	Film festival for kids in North America, held annually from late-February to mid-March.	
New York Jewish Film Festival	1992	New York City	New York showcase for world cinema exploring the Jewish experience. The NYJFF is presented by the Jewish Museum and the Film Society of Lincoln Center.	
New York Lesbian, Gay, Bisexual, & Transgender Film Festival	1988	New York City	Annaul LGBTQ film festival.	
New York Polish Film Festival	2005	New York City	Dedicated to the cinema of Poland.	
ReelAbilities	2007	New York City	Film festival in the U.S. dedicated to films by and about people with disabilities. Founded in New York City and tours throughout the United States.	
Tribeca Festival	2002	New York City	Founded by Jane Rosenthal and Robert De Niro.	

== North Carolina ==
Name	Est.	City	Notes	Ref
100 Words Film Festival	2014	Charlotte	Celebrating concise storytelling, each film must contain exactly 100 spoken words. Held annually in November.	
ActionFest	2010	Asheville		
Bastard Film Encounter	2013	Raleigh		
Cucalorus Film Festival	1994	Wilmington		
Full Frame Documentary Film Festival	1998	Durham		
Hayti Heritage Film Festival		Durham		
North Carolina Gay & Lesbian Film Festival	1995	Durham		
Real to Reel International Film Festival	2000	Kings Mountain		
RiverRun International Film Festival	1998	Winston-Salem		
Uptilt Film Fest	2016	Wilmington	Women and gender-nonconforming short format film festival	

== North Dakota ==
Name	Est.	City	Notes	Ref
Dakota Film Festival		Bismarck		
Fargo Film Festival		Fargo		
Human Rights Film Festival		Fargo		
North Dakota Environmental Rights Film Festival		Fargo		

== Ohio ==
Name	Est.	City	Notes	Ref
Athens International Film and Video Festival	1974	Athens		
Chagrin Documentary Film Festival	2010	Chagrin Falls	A five day celebration of documentary film, at venues in and around the century village of Chagrin Falls.	
Cincinnati Film Festival	2010	Cincinnati		
Cleveland International Film Festival	1977	Cleveland	A 12-day event held annually in spring; includes feature and short subject films.	
Columbus International Film & Animation Festival	1953	Columbus	North American film festival, held annually in November. As a competition festival, it is also known as The Chris Awards.	
CWRU Film Society Science Fiction Marathon	1976	Cleveland	Held annually by the Film Society of Case Western Reserve University, this is the longest-running 24+ hour movie marathon event.	
Greater Cleveland Urban Film Foundation	2012	Cleveland	The 9-day event, held in the fall, provides a forum to celebrate, preserve, promote and advance African American arts, culture and cinema.	
Nightmares Film Festival	2016	Columbus	International festival for horror and genre films	
Oxford International Film Festival	2007	Oxford		
Short Sweet Film Fest	2012	Cleveland		

== Oklahoma ==
Name	Est.	City	Notes	Ref
deadCENTER Film Festival	2001	Oklahoma City	"Designed to inspire growth in the local film industry and energize visiting film professionals."	

== Oregon ==
Name	Est.	City	Notes	Ref
Portland International Film Festival	1977	Portland		

== Pennsylvania ==
Name	Est.	City	Notes	Ref
BlackStar Film Festival	2012	Philadelphia	The festival focuses on films about and by black, brown and indigenous people from around the world. It is held annually each August.	
Eerie Horror Film Festival	2004	Erie, Pennsylvania	The Eerie Horror Fest is held each October and features a curated program of new, upcoming, and classic short and feature length films, plus celebrity guests participating in live, in-person Q&As, autographs, and photo opportunities.	
FirstGlance Film Festival	1996	Philadelphia	Screens local and international professional, first time, and student filmmakers, celebrating the best in indie film making from across the globe and locally produced Philadelphia Filmmakers.	
Free Speech Film Festival	2012	Philadelphia	An annual Philadelphia screening and awards program honoring international independent films about free expression and human rights.	
Israeli Film Festival of Philadelphia	1996	Philadelphia	A diverse and impartial celebration of Israeli culture, aimed at enriching the American vision of Israeli culture and society through film. Held annual in March/April.	
JFilm Festival	1994	Pittsburgh	Presents international films that deepen audiences’ understanding of Jewish culture, tolerance, and our common humanity. Largest Jewish cultural event in the Pittsburgh region.	
New Hope Film Festival	2009	New Hope, Pennsylvania	Presents international films that deepen audiences’ understanding of Jewish culture, tolerance, and our common humanity. Largest Jewish cultural event in the Pittsburgh region.	
Oil Valley Film Festival	2016	Oil City, Pennsylvania	First film festival of its kind in the "Oil Region" of Pennsylvania. Features films, in competition, from around the globe. The Oil Valley Film Festival is run by founder and festival director Matt Croyle. It is held annually in Oil City each September.	
Philadelphia Asian American Film Festival	2008	Philadelphia		
Philadelphia Film Festival	1991	Philadelphia	Presented by the Philadelphia Film Society, held annually in the fall.	
Philadelphia Independent Film Festival	2007	Philadelphia	Annual spring showcase of global independent and underground film submissions	
Philadelphia Jewish Film Festival	1981	Philadelphia	Dedicated to the Jewish experience, culture, values, and legacy	
Philadelphia Latino Film & Arts Festival	2012	Philadelphia	Committed to uplifting emerging and established Latine/x/a/o creatives and filmmakers by showcasing the richness, complexity, and cultural breadth of our communities.	
Philadelphia Unnamed Film Festival (PUFF)	2016	Philadelphia	An alternative film festival focused on an eclectic mix of features, short films and music videos across genres.	
Pittsburgh Independent Film Festival	2006	Pittsburgh	Showcases diverse experimental and independent international short films, features, documentaries, animated films, music videos and webisodes. Hosts script competitions.	
Pittsburgh Japanese Film Festival	2015	Philadelphia	Two-week celebration of classic and contemporary Japanese cinema at Row House Cinema	
Project Twenty1 Film Festival	2006	Philadelphia	Screenings include the Philadelphia Filmathon and the annual 21-Day Filmmaking Competition.	
QFest	1995	Philadelphia	Founded as the Philadelphia International Gay & Lesbian Film Festival, the name was changed to QFest in 2009. Presented by the Philadelphia Cinema Alliance.	
Reel Q: Pittsburgh LGBTQ+ Film Festival	1982	Pittsburgh	Spans ten days with a variety of screenings, programs, panels, parties, and community activities focused on the LGBTQ+ community of Pittsburgh and the world.	
Silk Screen Asian American Film Festival	2005	Pittsburgh	Cultural organization and film festival dedicated to Asian and Asian-American films.	
Three Rivers Film Festival	1982	Pittsburgh	A program of Pittsburgh Filmmakers, emphasizing independent film	

== Rhode Island ==
Name	Est.	City	Notes	Ref
Rhode Island International Film Festival	1997	Providence	Held annually for 6 days during the second week of August	

== South Carolina ==
Name	Est.	City	Notes	Ref
Beaufort International Film Festival	2007	Beaufort		
Crimson Screen Horror Film Fest		Columbia, Charleston		
Indie Grits Film Festival		Columbia		
Myrtle Beach International Film Festival		Myrtle Beach		
Southern City Film Festival		Aiken		
Underexposed Film Festival		Rock Hill		

== South Dakota ==
Name	Est.	City	Notes	Ref

== Tennessee ==
Name	Est.	City	Notes	Ref
Nashville Film Festival	1969	Nashville	Founded in 1969 as the Sinking Creek Film Celebration. Takes place in April and is an Academy Award-qualifying festival for Best Short Film and Best Animated Short Film. Features feature-length and short films from around the world.	
Lookout Wild Film Festival	2013	Chattanooga	The Lookout Wild Film Festival brings the best outdoor adventure and conservation films from around the world to Chattanooga for one awesome weekend every year.	

== Texas ==
Name	Est.	City	Notes	Ref
Boomtown Film and Music Festival	2005	Beaumont	Established to foster interest in the arts	
Cine Las Americas International Film Festival	1997	Austin	Held annually in the spring showcasing Latin American, Latino and Indigenous films.	
Dallas International Film Festival	2006	Dallas		
Fantastic Fest	2005	Austin		
Lone Star Film Festival	2007	Fort Worth		
Marfa Film Festival	2008	Marfa	Born out of reception of There Will Be Blood and No Country For Old Men, both of which were filmed in the area.	
San Antonio Independent Christian Film Festival	2004	San Antonio	Dedicated to Christian indie film.	
South by Southwest	1987	Austin	SXSW Film was added to the annual music festival in 1994, focusing on new directing talent.	

== Utah ==
Name	Est.	City	Notes	Ref
Red Rock Film Festival	2007	St. George	Located beneath the red mountains of Southern Utah this international festival is held annually each November.	
Sundance Film Festival	1978	Park City, Salt Lake City, Ogden, Sundance	Held annually in January, Sundance is the largest independent film festival in the United States.	

== Vermont ==
Name	Est.	City	Notes	Ref
Green Mountain Film Festival	1997	Montpelier	Showcases international narrative, documentary, and experimental features and shorts annually.	

== Virginia ==
Name	Est.	City	Notes	Ref
French Film Festival - Richmond, Virginia	1993	Richmond	The largest French film festival in the US, it takes place every year during the last week-end of March, featuring world and American premieres of French features and shorts.	
Virginia Film Festival	1988	Charlottesville	A program of the University of Virginia.	
Washington West Film Festival	2011	Reston	Washington West gives away 100% of their annual box office net proceeds to aiding communities in various ways. Runs for five days in late October.	

== Washington ==
Name	Est.	City	Notes	Ref
Maelstrom International Fantastic Film Festival	2009	Seattle	Dedicated to action, animation, cult, fantasy, horror, and science fiction cinema.	
National Film Festival for Talented Youth	2007	Seattle	Youth film festival, showcasing the work of filmmakers from around the globe (aged 22 or under)	
Port Townsend Film Festival	1999	Port Townsend	An international festival held annually the third weekend in September.	
Seattle International Film Festival	1976	Seattle	One of the largest film festivals in the United States.	
Seattle Latino Film Festival	2009	Seattle	It is the only and largest Latino film festival in the Pacific Northwest.	
Tasveer South Asian Film Festival	2002	Seattle	It is the largest south Asian film festival in the United States.	
Tacoma Film Festival	2006	Tacoma	Features independent films, emphasizing films the Pacific Northwest, and documentaries	

== West Virginia ==
Name	Est.	City	Notes	Ref
American Conservation Film Festival	2003	Shepherdstown	Annual festival with the mission statement of "conservation-focused films and programs that engage, inform, and inspire"	
Appalachian Film Festival	2003	Huntington	Annual film festival in late April. Feature-length narrative & documentary films and shorts.	
MTN Craft Film Festival	2023	Clarksburg	Annual 4-day film festival in early October. Feature-length narrative & documentary films and shorts.	

== Wisconsin ==
Name	Est.	City	Notes	Ref
Beloit International Film Festival	2006	Beloit	Annual 10-day film festival in late February. Feature length narrative & documentary films and shorts.	
Green Bay Film Festival	2010	De Pere	Celebrating independent filmmakers in Wisconsin and around the world.	
Milwaukee Film Festival	2009	Milwaukee	Held annually in September and October. Presented by Milwaukee Film.	
Milwaukee Jewish Film Festival	1997	Milwaukee	Held annually in October. Presented by the Harry & Rose Samson Family Jewish Community Center.	
Wisconsin Film Festival	1999	Madison	Annual showcase of independent and international documentary, narrative, experimental, student and animated films. Runs for four days in early April.	

== Wyoming ==
Name	Est.	City	Notes	Ref
Jackson Wild	1991	Jackson		

== Puerto Rico ==
Name	Est.	City	Notes	Ref
Puerto Rico Film Festival	2009	San Juan		
Puerto Rico Queer Filmfest	2009	Santurce		
Rincón International Film Festival	2008	Rincón		

== District of Columbia ==
Name	Est.	Notes	Ref
Capitol Hill Film Classic	2018	The only bracket style knockout competition for short film in the US.	
DC Asian Pacific American Film Festival	2000	Held annually in October.	

== US Territories ==
Name	Est.	City	Notes	Ref
Guam International Film Festival	2011	Hagåtña, Guam		
Virgin Islands International Film and Video Festival		St. Thomas, U.S. Virgin Islands		
