= Departure =

Departure, Departures, Departures(s) or The Departure may refer to:

== Literal meaning ==
- Departure, also called takeoff, the phase of flight from moving along the ground to flying in the air
- Departures, the section of a transport hub designated for outgoing passengers, freight, and vehicles

== Arts, entertainment, and media ==
=== Paintings ===
- Departure (Beckmann), a 1932–1935 triptych by German painter Max Beckmann

=== Films ===
- Departure (1931 film), a French drama film
- Departure (1938 film), an Italian comedy film
- Departure (1986 film), an Australian film
- Departures (2008 film), a Japanese drama film
- Departures (2011 film), a Turkish short film
- Departure (2015 film), a British independent film
- Departures (2025 film), a British LGBT romantic comedy-drama film
- The Departure (1967 film), a Belgian film
- The Departure (2017 film), an American film
- Then Came You (2018 film), an American film also known as Departures
- Unfinished (film), a 2018 Korean film previously known as Departure

=== Literature ===
- Departures (magazine), an American lifestyle magazine
- Departure(s), a work of fiction by Julian Barnes
- Departures (short story collection), by Harry Turtledove
- The Departure (novel), by K.A. Applegate
- "The Departure" (short story), by Franz Kafka

=== Music ===
- The Departure, an English rock band

==== Albums ====
- Departure (Jesse McCartney album), 2008
- Departure (Journey album), 1980
- Departure (Taio Cruz album), 2008
- Departure, 1969 album by Pat Boone
- Departures (album), 2013 album by Bernard Fanning
- Samurai Champloo Music Record: Departure, 2004
- Departures, 2021 album by Jon Foreman

==== Songs ====
- "Departure", a song by The Moody Blues from the 1968 album In Search of the Lost Chord
- "Departure", a song by Living Sacrifice from the 1994 album Inhabit
- "Departure", a song by R.E.M. from the 1996 album New Adventures in Hi-Fi
- "Departure", a song by Glen Phillips from the 2003 documentary film, Ghosts of the Abyss
- "Departure", a song by Trivium from the 2005 album Ascendancy
- "Departure", a song by Mors Principium Est from the 2012 album ...And Death Said Live
- "Departure", a song by Misery Signals from the 2013 album Absent Light
- "Departure", a song by Scandal from the 2014 album Hello World
- "Departure", a song by Fallujah from the 2019 album Undying Light
- "Departure!", a 2011 song by Masatoshi Ono
- "Departures" (Globe song), 1996
- "Departures", a song by Blessthefall from the 2015 album To Those Left Behind
- "(It's A) Departure", a song by The Long Winters from the 2006 album Putting the Days to Bed
- "Departure (Death)", a song by In Hearts Wake from the 2012 album Divination
- "The Departure", a song by Hypocrisy from the 2004 album The Arrival
- "The Departure", a song by Abigail Williams from the 2008 album In the Shadow of a Thousand Suns
- "The Departure", a song by Firewind from the 2010 album Days of Defiance
- "The Departure", a song by Celldweller from the 2012 album Wish Upon a Blackstar
- "The Departure", a song by Falling in Reverse from the 2017 album Coming Home
- "Départe" (French for "Departure"), a song by Rosetta from the 2005 album The Galilean Satellites

=== Television ===
- Departure (TV series), a Canadian-British suspense drama series
- Departures (TV series), a Canadian adventure travel documentary series
- "Departures" (Blood & Oil), a 2015 episode
- "Departures" (The White Lotus), a 2021 episode
- "Departure", the final episode of Naruto

== See also ==
- Departure Lake (disambiguation)
- Departure Lounge (disambiguation)
- Point of Departure (disambiguation)
