= BFE =

BFE may refer to:

- Bacterial filtration efficiency, a measurement of filtration efficiency of filtration systems such as surgical face masks
- Base Flood Elevation, a level set by the Federal Emergency Management Agency based on 100 year flood models; see Flood opening
- Bastard Film Encounter, a US-based film festival
- Beweissicherungs- und Festnahmeeinheiten or arrest units, police support groups in Germany
- British Film Editors, a not-for profit honorary society of professional British Film and Television Editors
- Brooklyn Funk Essentials, a music collective
- Serious Sam 3: BFE, a video game
- BFE, the National Rail station code for Bere Ferrers railway station, Devon, England

== See also ==
- ISO 639:bfe or Betaf language, a Papuan language of Indonesia
- 5-MeO-BFE or Dimemebfe, a recreational drug and research chemical
