= Densch =

Densch is a German language surname. Notable people with the name include:

- Hermann Densch (1887–1963), German admiral
- Wayne Densch (1917–1994), American entrepreneur
