= Louver =

Window protection with horizontal angled slats

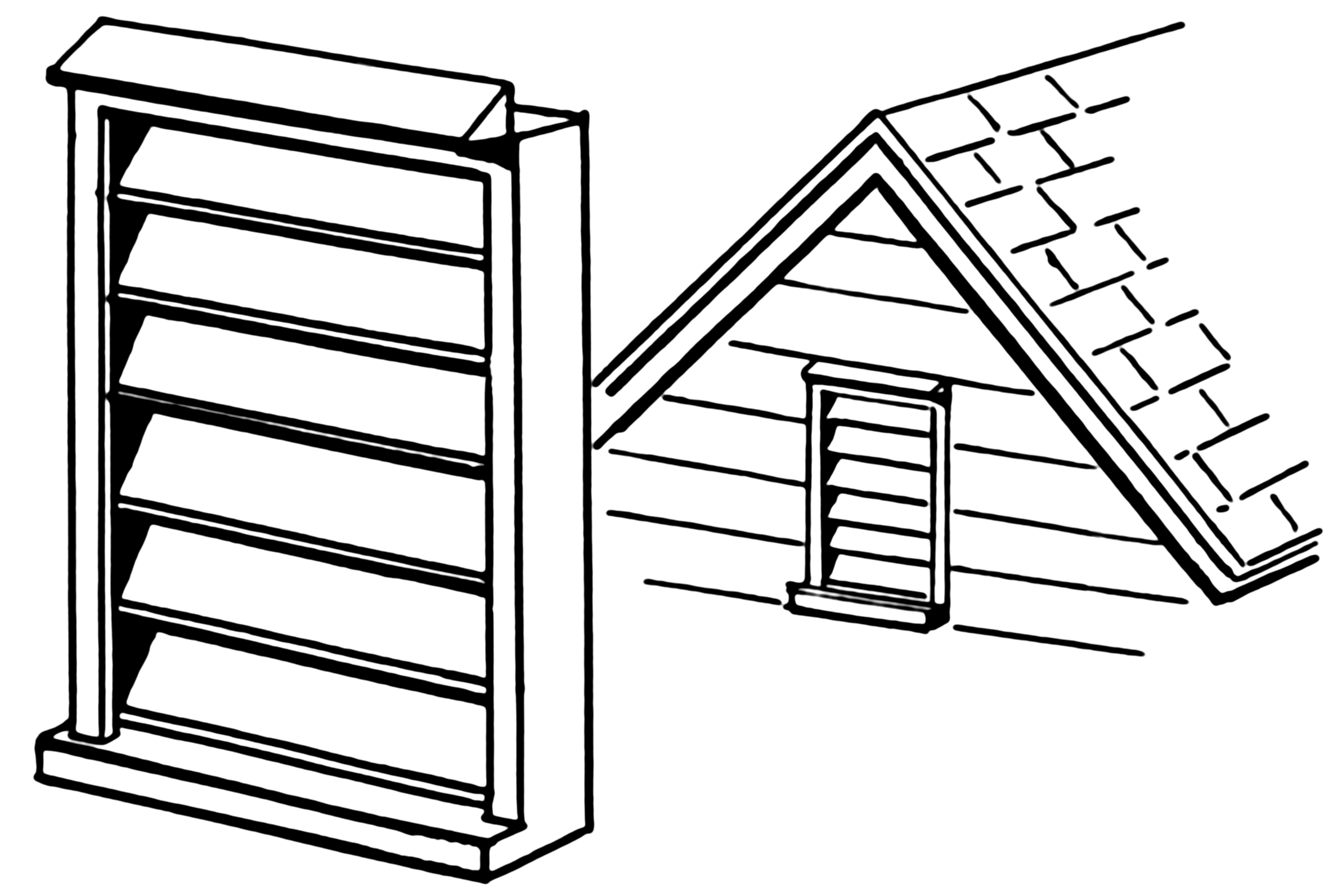
Concept drawing of a louver gable vent

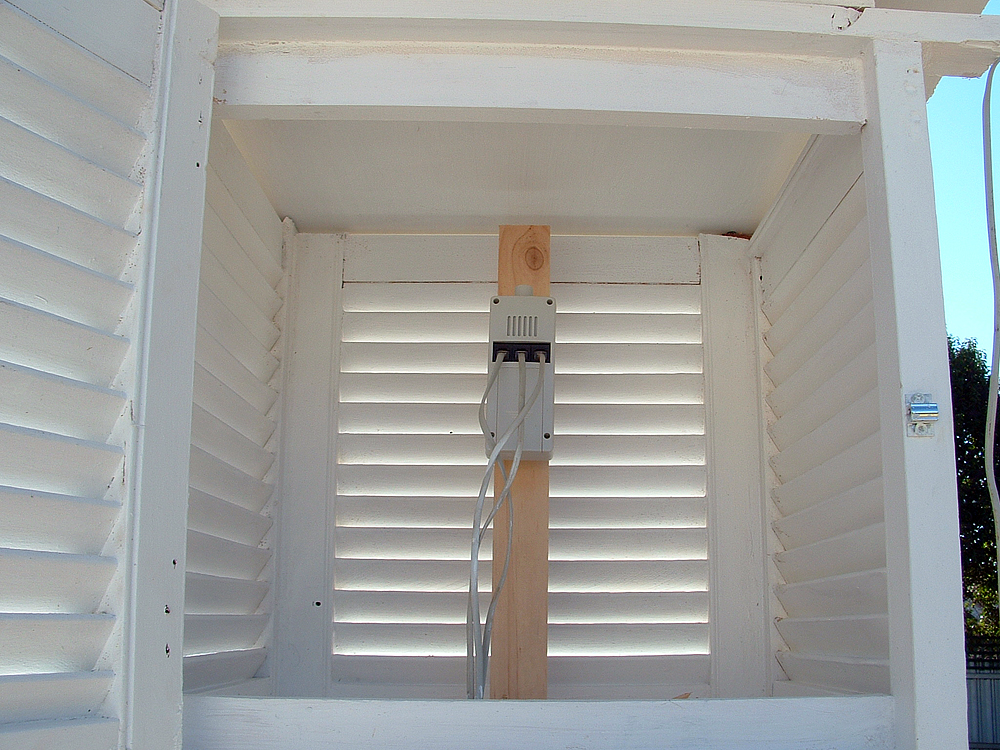
Louvers used in a Stevenson screen

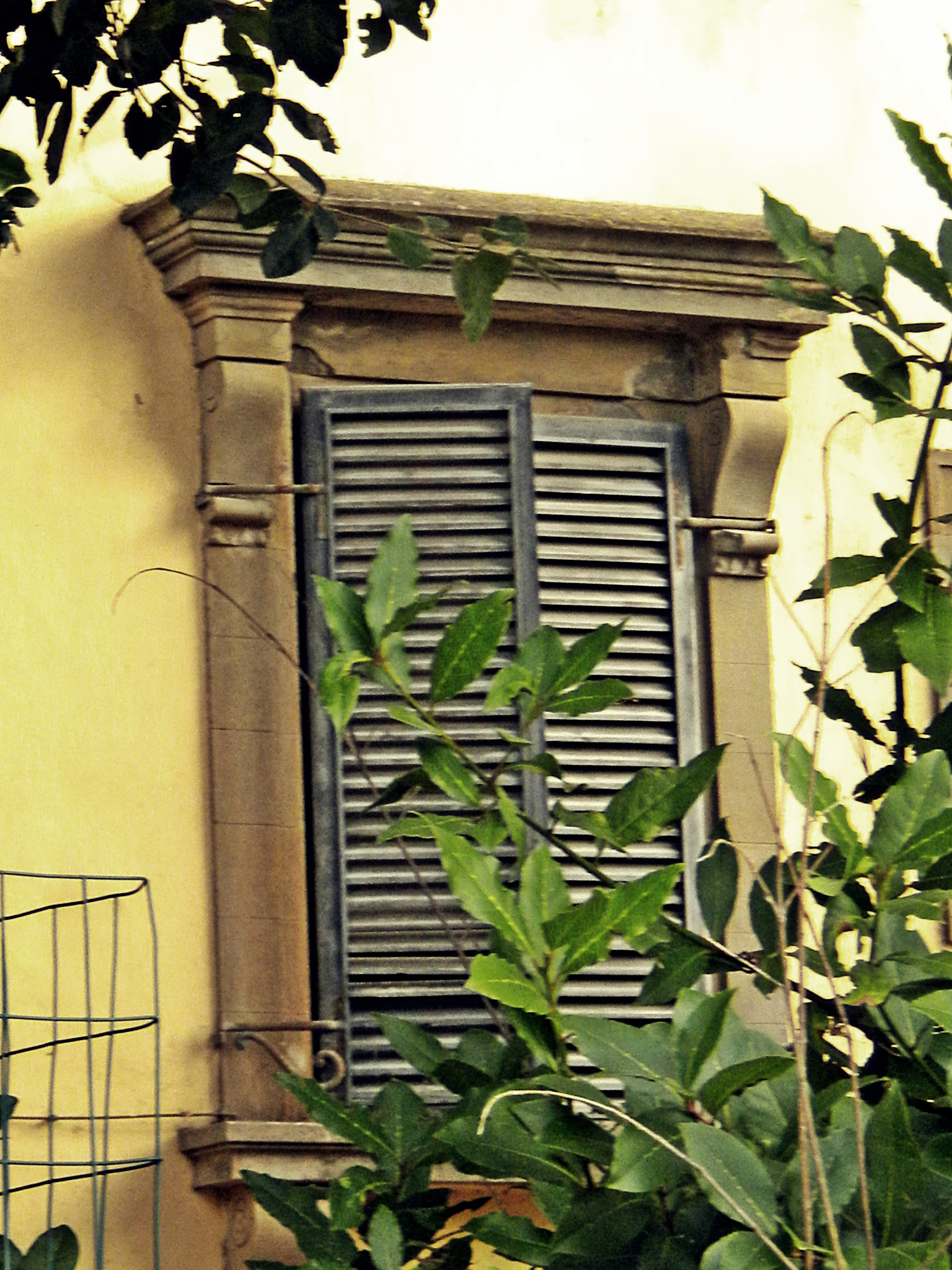
Louver exterior shutters in Italy

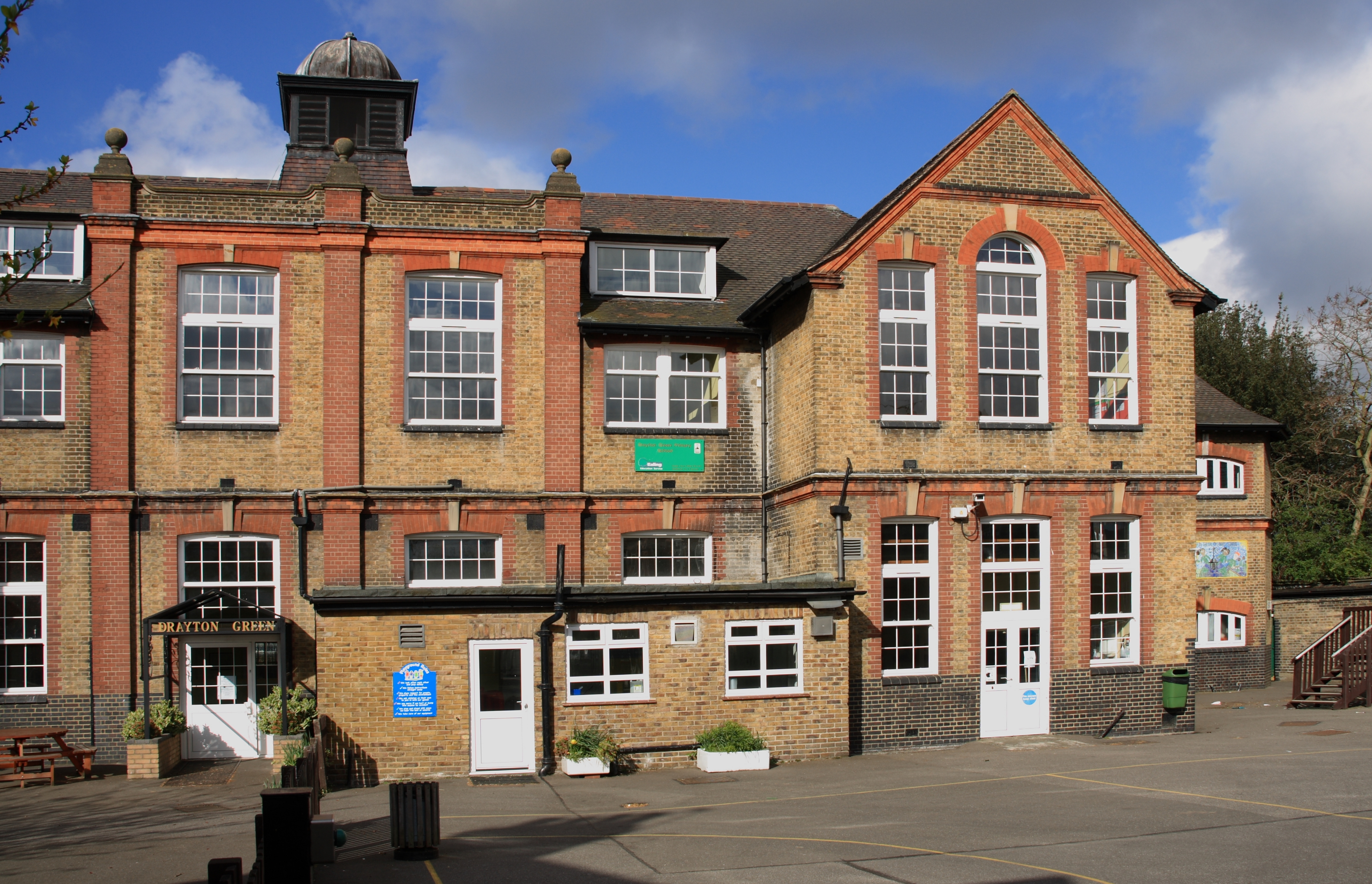
Louvered cupola bell house

A louver (American) or louvre (Commonwealth English; see spelling differences) is a framed opening fitted with horizontal slats in a structure. These slats are angled to admit light and air, as well as to keep out rain and direct sunshine. The angle of the slats may be adjustable, usually in blinds and windows, or fixed, such as in exterior shutters.

== History ==
Louvers originated in the Middle Ages as lantern-like constructions in wood that were fitted on top of roof holes in large kitchens to allow ventilation while keeping out rain and snow. They were originally rather crude constructions consisting merely of a barrel.

Later, they evolved into more elaborate designs made of pottery, taking the shape of faces where the smoke and steam from cooking would pour out through the eyes and mouth, or into constructions that were more like modern louvers, with slats that could be opened or closed by pulling on a string.

== Construction ==
Modern louvers are often made of aluminum, metal, wood, or glass. They may be opened and closed with a metal lever, pulleys, or through motorized operators.

The Australian Standard specifies requirements for the construction of buildings using louver in bushfire-prone areas in order to improve their resistance to bushfire attack from burning embers, radiant heat, flame contact and combinations of the three attack forms. The revised building standard details various construction methods and materials that must be used depending on the homes level of bushfire risk. This includes changes to the window and glazing requirements for homes located in a Bushfire Attack Level category greater than BAL-Low.

== Jalousies ==
Often used interchangeably by mistake, the key difference between louvers and jalousies is that louvers are fixed position. Jalousies are installed within a movable adjustable mechanism which positions all jalousies into any parallel position with respect to each other.

== Use ==
=== In architecture ===
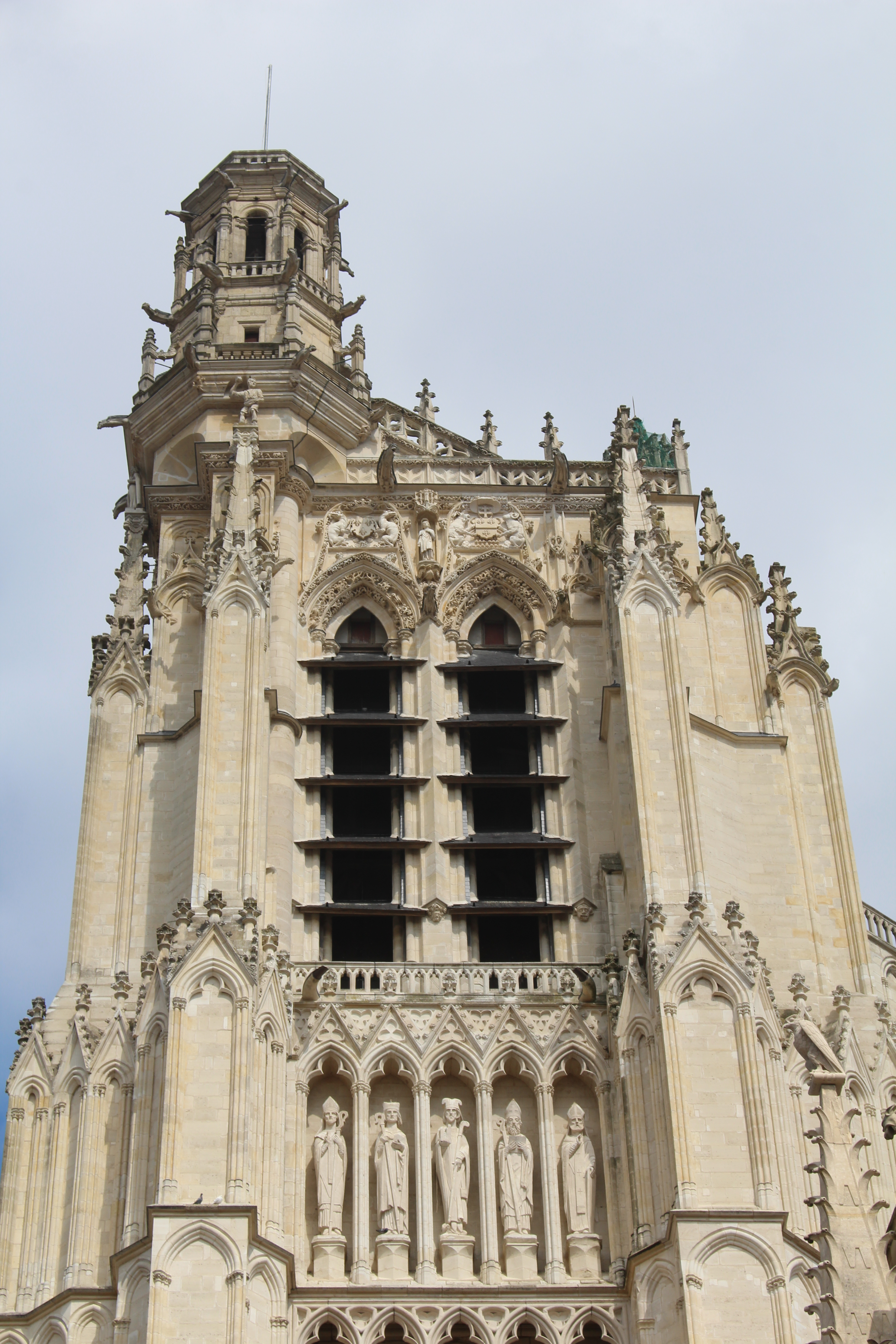
The belfry louvers of Sens Cathedral, France

Louvers are rarely seen as primary design elements in the language of modern architecture, but rather simply a technical device. Louvers are part of the design of Demerara windows to help keep 18th and 19th century buildings cool in hot climates and block direct sunlight. Some modern louver systems serve to improve indoor daylighting. Fixed mirrored louver systems can limit glare and of redirect diffuse light. Such louvers may be integrated in between two panes of double glazing. In industrial facilities such as steel foundries and power plants, louvers are very common. They are utilized for natural ventilation and temperature control.

Louvers are frequently found in bell towers, where they are utilised to let out as much sound as possible, while having the bells remain unexposed to the weather.

There are examples of architects who use louvers as part of the overall aesthetic effect of their buildings. The most well-known example is Finnish modernist architect Alvar Aalto who would create aesthetic effects in the facades of his buildings through the combination of different types and sizes of louvers, some fixed some moveable, and made mostly from wood (e.g., the various buildings of the Helsinki University of Technology). A second example, taking influence from Aalto, is the second-generation modernist architect Juha Leiviskä.

=== In infrastructure ===
Louvers may be used as a type of flood opening, usually covered by one or more moving flaps. They are designed to allow floodwaters to enter and leave the building, equalizing hydrostatic pressure on the walls and mitigating structural damage due to flooding. Louver windows are a staple in the design of homes and perfect to withstand the pressures of future cyclonic conditions. Cyclone homes have always been synonymous with louver windows, louver blades have been tested for 'debris type B' for cyclonic regions.

=== In transportation ===
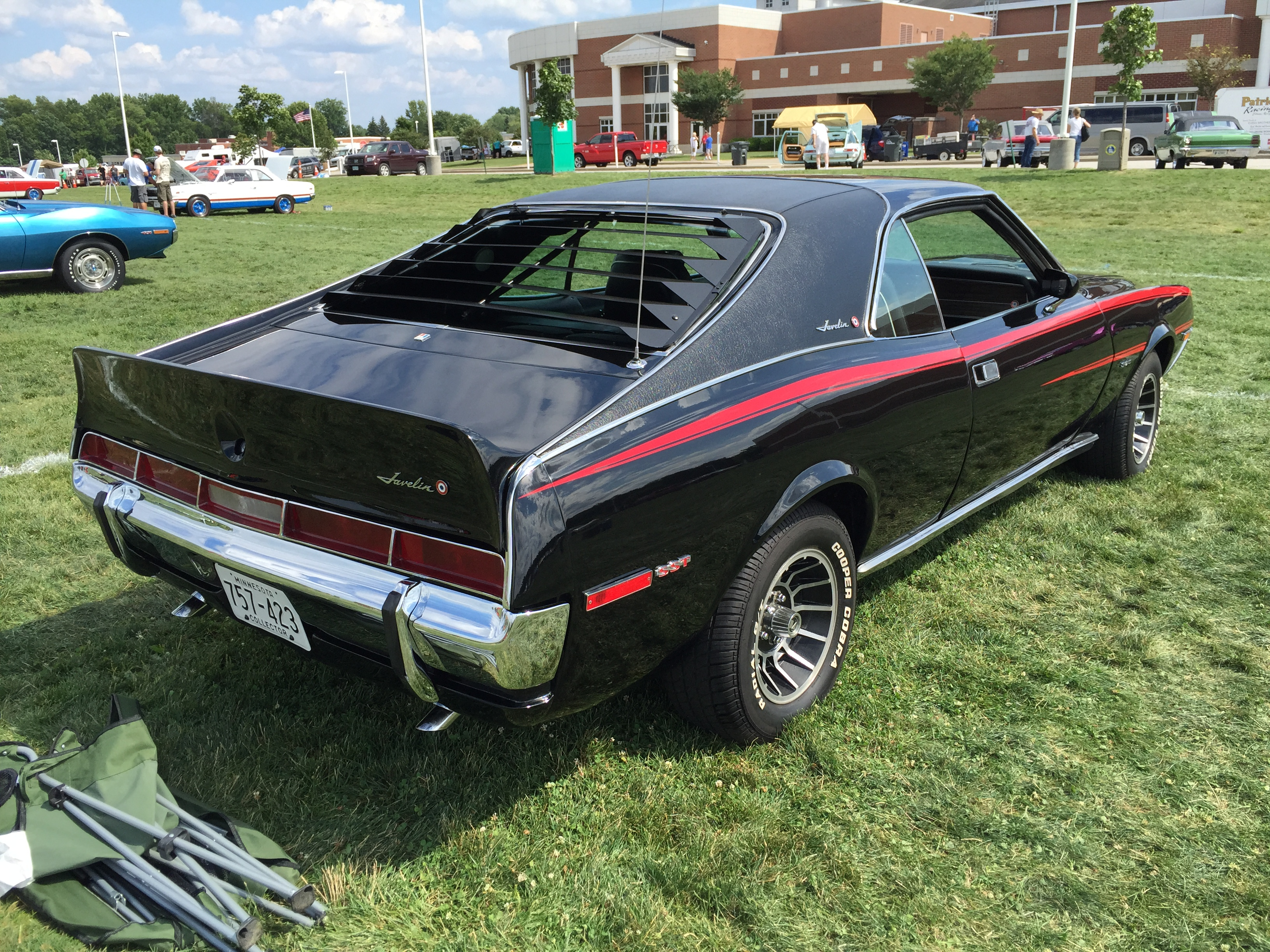
Louvers mounted to the rear window of a 1970 AMC Javelin

Rear window louvers are also available as an accessory for some automobiles. They have also been used over the years in hoods, trunk lids, and other various body panels; typically hot rods, but by no means exclusive to that period. Their purpose in this regard is both as a functional means of ventilation, but also as a styling modification.

Louvers are used as semi-passive means of thermal control on airplanes and spacecraft as well.

Louvers may also be used on traffic light lenses to prevent traffic from seeing the wrong traffic signal.

== See also ==
- Air conditioning
- Jalousie window
- Window shutter
