= Floodplain =

Land adjacent to a water body which is flooded during periods of high water

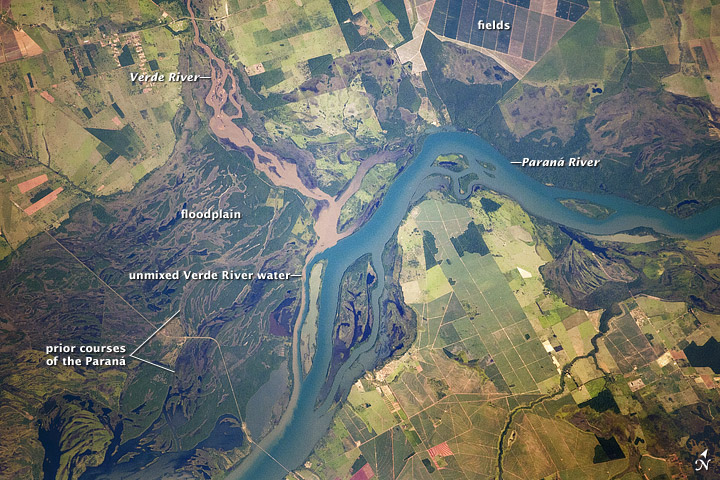
Paraná River floodplain, at its confluence with the headstream of the Paranaíba (on the right) and the Verde River, near Panorama, Brazil

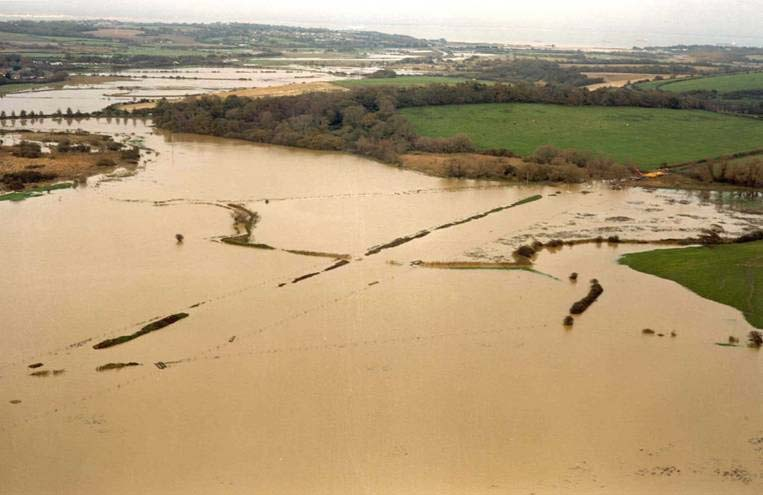
A floodplain after a one-in-10-year flood on the Isle of Wight

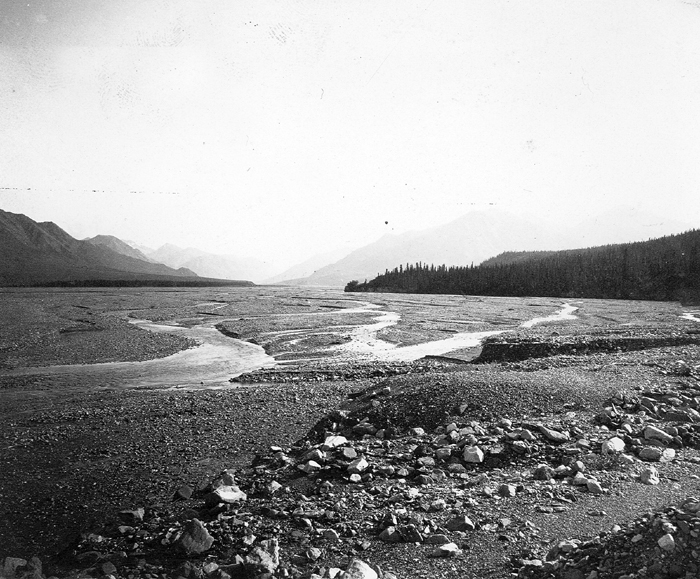
Gravel floodplain of a glacial river near the Snow Mountains in Alaska, 1902

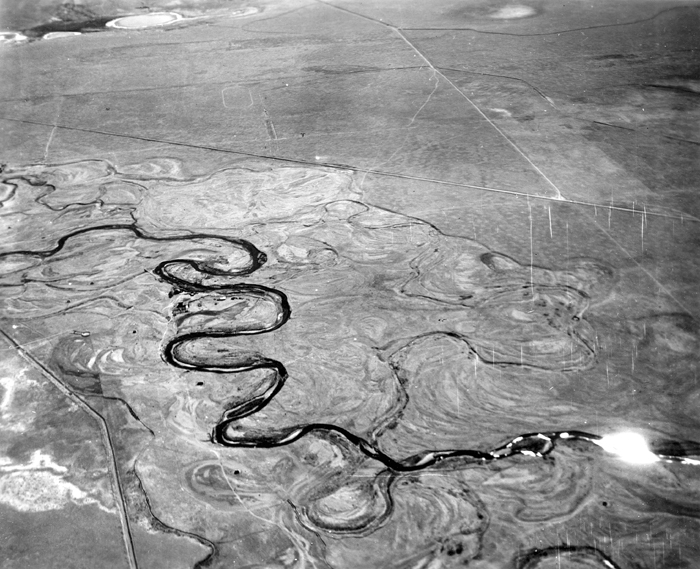
The Laramie River meanders across its floodplain in Albany County, Wyoming, 1949

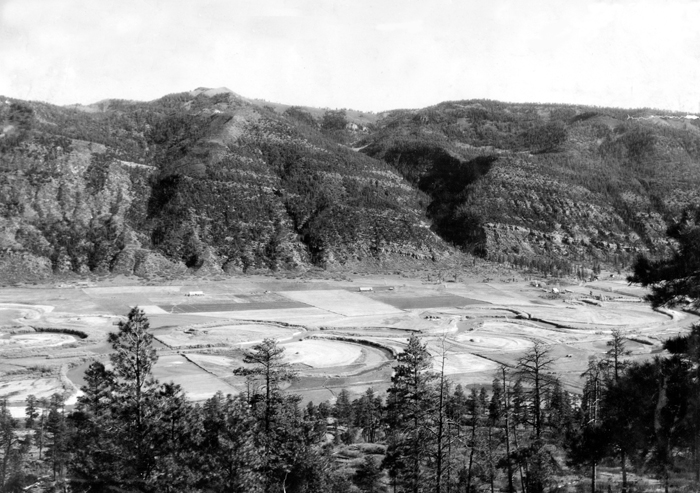
This aggradational floodplain of a small meandering stream in La Plata County, Colorado, is underlain by silt deposited above a dam formed by a terminal moraine left by the Wisconsin Glacier.

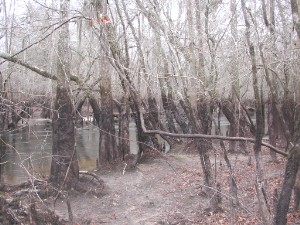
Riparian vegetation on the floodplain of the Lynches River, close to Johnsonville, South Carolina. These tupelo and cypress trees show the high-water mark of flooding.

A floodplain or flood plain or bottomlands is an area of land adjacent to a river that stretches from the banks of the river channel to the base of the enclosing valley and experiences flooding during periods of high discharge. The soils usually consist of clays, silts, sands, and gravels deposited during floods.

Because of regular flooding, floodplains frequently have high soil fertility since nutrients are deposited with the flood waters. This can encourage farming; some important agricultural regions, such as the Nile and Mississippi river basins, heavily exploit floodplains. Agricultural and urban regions have developed near or on floodplains to take advantage of the rich soil and freshwater. However, the risk of inundation has led to increasing efforts to control flooding.

== Formation ==
Most floodplains are formed by deposition on the inside of river meanders and by overbank flow.

Wherever the river meanders, the flowing water erodes the river bank on the outside of the meander. At the same time, sediments are simultaneously deposited in a bar on the inside of the meander. This is described as lateral accretion since the deposition builds the point bar laterally into the river channel. Erosion on the outside of the meander usually closely balances deposition on the inside so that the channel shifts in the direction of the meander without changing significantly in width. The point bar is built up to a level very close to that of the river banks. Significant net erosion of sediments occurs only when the meander cuts into higher ground. The overall effect is that, as the river meanders, it creates a level floodplain composed mostly of point bar deposits. The rate at which the channel shifts varies greatly, with reported rates ranging from too slow to measure to as much as 2,400 feet (730 m) per year for the Kosi River of India.

Overbank flow takes place when the river is flooded with more water than can be accommodated by the river channel. Flow over the banks of the river deposits a thin veneer of sediments that is coarsest and thickest close to the channel. This is described as vertical accretion, since the deposits build upwards. In undisturbed river systems, overbank flow is frequent, typically occurring every one to two years, regardless of climate or topography. Sedimentation rates for a three-day flood of the Meuse and Rhine Rivers in 1993 found average sedimentation rates in the floodplain of between 0.57 and 1.0 kg/m^{2}. Higher rates were found on the levees (4 kg/m^{2} or more) and on low-lying areas (1.6 kg/m^{2}).

Sedimentation from the overbank flow is concentrated on natural levees, crevasse splays, and in wetlands and shallow lakes of flood basins. Natural levees are ridges along river banks that form from rapid deposition from the overbank flow. Most of the suspended sand is deposited on the levees, leaving the silt and clay sediments to be deposited as floodplain mud further from the river. Levees are typically built up enough to be relatively well-drained compared with nearby wetlands, and levees in non-arid climates are often heavily vegetated.

Crevasses are formed by breakout events from the main river channel. The river bank fails, and floodwaters scour a channel. Sediments from the crevasse spread out as delta-shaped deposits with numerous distributary channels. Crevasse formation is most common in sections of rivers where the river bed is accumulating sediments (aggrading).

Repeated flooding eventually builds up an alluvial ridge, whose natural levees and abandoned meander loops may stand well above most of the floodplain. The alluvial ridge is topped by a channel belt formed by successive generations of channel migration and meander cutoff. At much longer intervals, the river may abandon the channel belt and build a new one at another position on the floodplain. This process is called avulsion and occurs at intervals of 10–1000 years. Historical avulsions leading to catastrophic flooding include the 1855 Yellow River flood and the 2008 Kosi River flood.

Floodplains can form around rivers of any kind or size. Even relatively straight stretches of river are capable of producing floodplains. Mid-channel bars in braided rivers migrate downstream through processes resembling those in point bars of meandering rivers and can build up a floodplain.

The quantity of sediments in a floodplain greatly exceeds the river load of sediments. Thus, floodplains are an important storage site for sediments during their transport from where they are generated to their ultimate depositional environment.

When the rate at which the river is cutting downwards becomes great enough that overbank flows become infrequent, the river is said to have abandoned its floodplain. Portions of the abandoned floodplain may be preserved as fluvial terraces.

== Ecology ==
Floodplains support diverse and productive ecosystems. They are characterized by considerable variability in space and time, which in turn produces some of the most species-rich of ecosystems. From the ecological perspective, the most distinctive aspect of floodplains is the flood pulse associated with annual floods, and so the floodplain ecosystem is defined as the part of the river valley that is regularly flooded and dried.

Floods bring in detrital material rich in nutrients and release nutrients from dry soil as it is flooded. The decomposition of terrestrial plants submerged by the floodwaters adds to the nutrient supply. The flooded littoral zone of the river (the zone closest to the river bank) provides an ideal environment for many aquatic species, so the spawning season for fish often coincides with the onset of flooding. Fish must grow quickly during the flood to survive the subsequent drop in water level. As the floodwaters recede, the littoral experiences blooms of microorganisms, while the banks of the river dry out and terrestrial plants germinate to stabilize the bank.

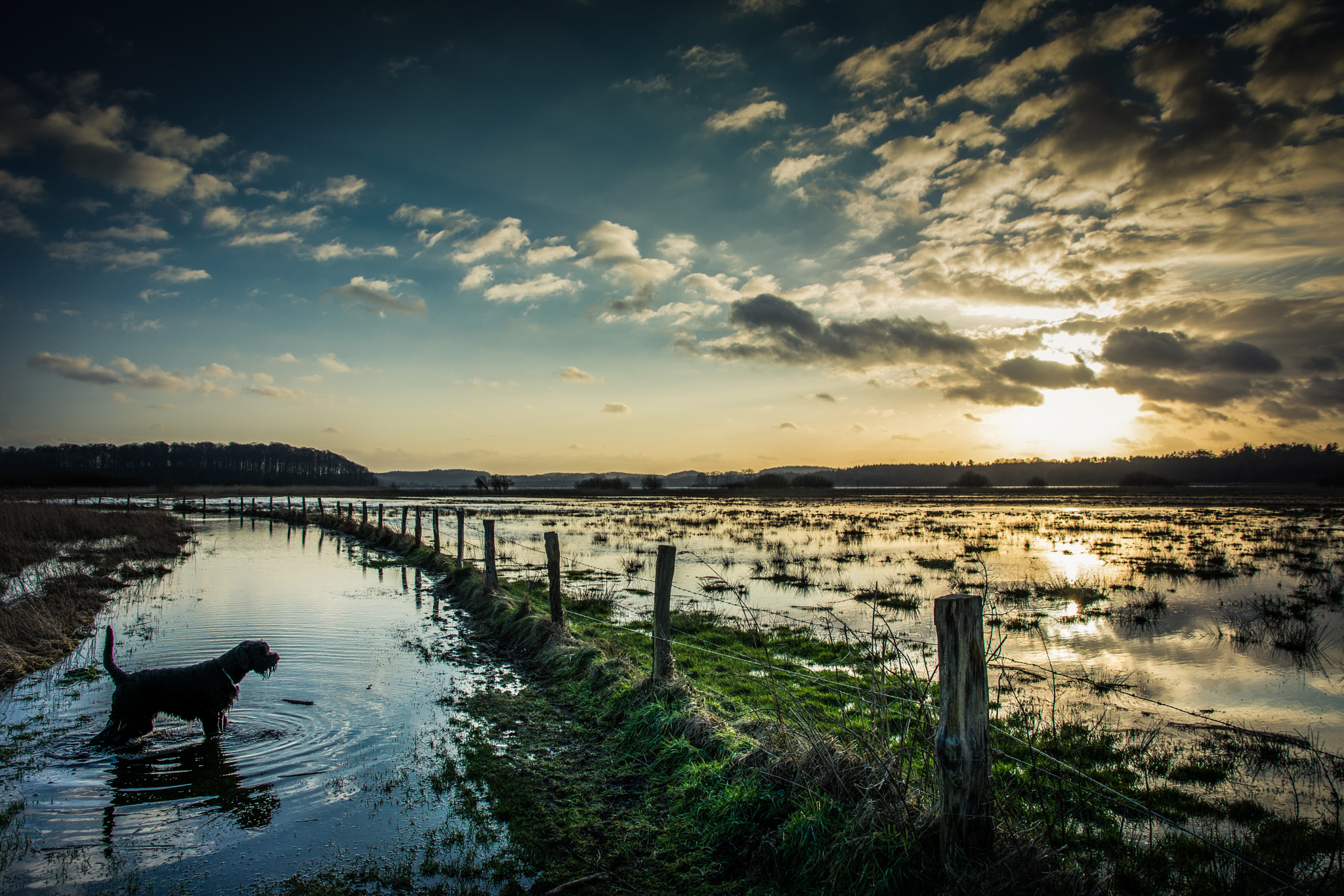
A low-lying field in Achterwehr Germany inundated by overflow from a nearby waterway.

The biota of floodplains has high annual growth and mortality rates, which is advantageous for the rapid colonization of large areas of the floodplain. This allows them to take advantage of shifting floodplain geometry. For example, floodplain trees are fast-growing and tolerant of root disturbance. Opportunists (such as birds) are attracted to the rich food supply provided by the flood pulse.

Floodplain ecosystems have distinct biozones. In Europe, as one moves away from the river, the successive plant communities are bank vegetation (usually annuals); sedge and reeds; willow shrubs; willow-poplar forest; oak-ash forest; and broadleaf forest. Human disturbance creates wet meadows that replace much of the original ecosystem. The biozones reflect a soil moisture and oxygen gradient that in turn corresponds to a flooding frequency gradient. The primeval floodplain forests of Europe were dominated by oak (60%) elm (20%) and hornbeam (13%), but human disturbance has shifted the makeup towards ash (49%) with maple increasing to 14% and oak decreasing to 25%.

Semiarid floodplains have a much lower species diversity. Species are adapted to alternating drought and flood. Extreme drying can destroy the ability of the floodplain ecosystem to shift to a healthy wet phase when flooded.

Floodplain forests constituted 1% of the landscape of Europe in the 1800s. Much of this has been cleared by human activity, though floodplain forests have been impacted less than other kinds of forests. This makes them important refugia for biodiversity. Human destruction of floodplain ecosystems is largely a result of flood control, hydroelectric development (such as reservoirs), and conversion of floodplains to agriculture use. Transportation and waste disposal also have detrimental effects. The result is the fragmentation of these ecosystems, resulting in loss of populations and diversity and endangering the remaining fragments of the ecosystem. Flood control creates a sharper boundary between water and land than in undisturbed floodplains, reducing physical diversity. Floodplain forests protect waterways from erosion and pollution and reduce the impact of floodwaters.

The disturbance by humans of temperate floodplain ecosystems frustrates attempts to understand their natural behavior. Tropical rivers are less impacted by humans and provide models for temperate floodplain ecosystems, which are thought to share many of their ecological attributes.

== Flood control ==
Excluding famines and epidemics, some of the worst natural disasters in history (measured by fatalities) have been river floods, particularly in the Yellow River in China – see list of deadliest floods. The worst of these, and the worst natural disaster (excluding famine and epidemics), was the 1931 China floods, estimated to have killed millions. This had been preceded by the 1887 Yellow River flood, which killed around one million people and is the second-worst natural disaster in history.

The extent of floodplain inundation depends partly on flood magnitude, defined by the return period.

In the United States, the Federal Emergency Management Agency (FEMA) manages the National Flood Insurance Program (NFIP). The NFIP offers insurance to properties located within a flood-prone area, as defined by the Flood Insurance Rate Map (FIRM), which depicts various flood risks for a community. The FIRM typically focuses on the delineation of the 100-year flood inundation area, also known within the NFIP as the Special Flood Hazard Area.

Where a detailed study of a waterway has been done, the 100-year floodplain will also include the floodway, the critical portion of the floodplain which includes the stream channel and any adjacent areas that must be kept free of encroachments that might block flood flows or restrict storage of flood waters. Another commonly encountered term is the Special Flood Hazard Area, which is any area subject to inundation by a 100-year flood. A problem is that any alteration of the watershed upstream of the point in question can potentially affect the ability of the watershed to handle water, and thus potentially affects the levels of the periodic floods. A large shopping center and parking lot, for example, may raise the levels of 5-year, 100-year, and other floods, but the maps are rarely adjusted and are frequently rendered obsolete by subsequent development.

In order for a flood-prone property to qualify for government-subsidized insurance, a local community must adopt an ordinance that protects the floodway and requires that new residential structures built in Special Flood Hazard Areas be elevated to at least the level of the 100-year flood. Commercial structures can be elevated or floodproofed to or above this level. In some areas without detailed study information, structures may be required to be elevated to at least two feet above the surrounding grade. Many State and local governments have, in addition, adopted floodplain construction regulations which are more restrictive than those mandated by the NFIP. The US government also sponsors flood hazard mitigation efforts to reduce flood impacts. California's Hazard Mitigation Program is one funding source for mitigation projects. A number of whole towns such as English, Indiana, have been completely relocated to remove them from the floodplain. Other smaller-scale mitigation efforts include acquiring and demolishing flood-prone buildings or flood-proofing them.

In some floodplains, such as the Inner Niger Delta of Mali, annual flooding events are a natural part of the local ecology and rural economy, allowing for the raising of crops through recessional agriculture. However, in Bangladesh, which occupies the Ganges Delta, the advantages provided by the richness of the alluvial soil of the floodplain are severely offset by frequent floods brought on by cyclones and annual monsoon rains. These extreme weather events cause severe economic disruption and loss of human life in the densely populated region.

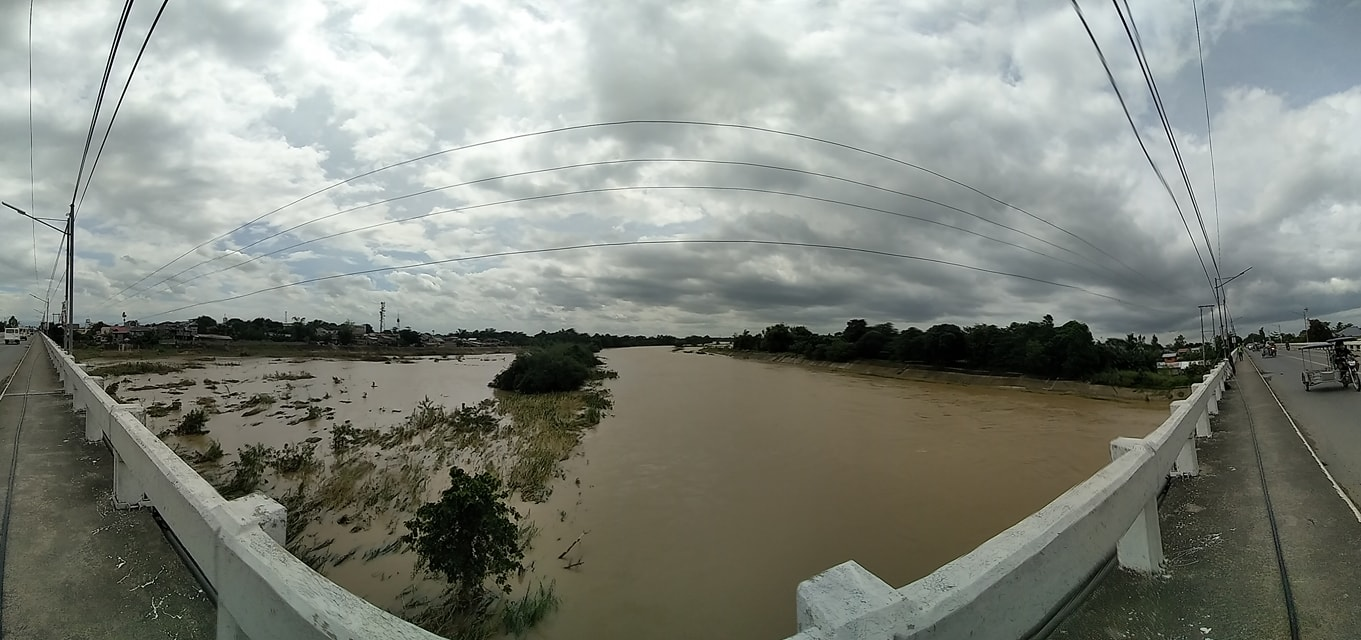
Flooding of Pampanga River floodplain after Typhoon Quinta, 2020 (view from Santa Rosa, Nueva Ecija bridge).

== Floodplain soils ==
=== Oxygen in floodplain soils ===
Floodplain soil composition is unique and varies widely based on microtopography. Floodplain forests have high topographic heterogeneity which creates variation in localized hydrologic conditions. Soil moisture within the upper 30 cm of the soil profile also varies widely based on microtopography, which affects oxygen availability. Floodplain soil stays aerated for long periods in between flooding events, but during flooding, saturated soil can become oxygen-depleted if it stands stagnant for long enough. More soil oxygen is available at higher elevations farther from the river. Floodplain forests generally experience alternating periods of aerobic and anaerobic soil microbe activity, affecting fine root development and desiccation.

=== Phosphorus cycling in floodplain soils ===
Floodplains have high buffering capacity for phosphorus to prevent nutrient loss to river outputs. Phosphorus nutrient loading is a problem in freshwater systems. Much of the phosphorus in freshwater systems comes from municipal wastewater treatment plants and agricultural runoff. Stream connectivity controls whether phosphorus cycling is mediated by floodplain sediments or by external processes. Under conditions of stream connectivity, phosphorus is better able to be cycled, and sediments and nutrients are more readily retained. Water in freshwater streams ends up in either short-term storage in plants or algae or long-term in sediments. Wet/dry cycling within the floodplain greatly impacts phosphorus availability because it alters water level, redox state, pH, and physical properties of minerals. Dry soils that were previously inundated have reduced availability of phosphorus and increased affinity for obtaining phosphorus. Human floodplain alterations also impact the phosphorus cycle. Particulate phosphorus and soluble reactive phosphorus (SRP) can contribute to algal blooms and toxicity in waterways when the nitrogen-to-phosphorus ratios are altered farther upstream. In areas where the phosphorus load is primarily particulate phosphorus, like the Mississippi River, the most effective ways of removing phosphorus upstream are sedimentation, soil accretion, and burial. In basins where SRP is the primary form of phosphorus, biological uptake in floodplain forests is the best way of removing nutrients. Phosphorus can transform between SRP and particulate phosphorus depending on ambient conditions or processes like decomposition, biological uptake, redoximorphic release, and sedimentation and accretion. In either phosphorus form, floodplain forests are beneficial as phosphorus sinks, and the human-caused disconnect between floodplains and rivers exacerbates the phosphorus overload.

=== Environmental pollutants in floodplain soils ===
Floodplain soils tend to be high in eco-pollutants, especially persistent organic pollutant (POP) deposition. Proper understanding of the distribution of soil contaminants is complex because of high variation in microtopography and soil texture within floodplains.

== See also ==
- Alluvial plain – Region on which rivers have deposited sediment
- Flood-meadow – Land adjacent to a river subject to seasonal flooding
- Water-meadow – Artificially irrigated meadow
- Red River Floodway – Artificial flood control channel in Manitoba, Canada as a good example of a floodway.
- Floodplain restoration – Restoration of a river's floodplain
- Flood opening – Technique for mitigating the effects of flooding on structures

== Sources ==
- Powell, W. Gabe. 2009. Identifying Land Use/Land Cover (LULC) Using National Agriculture Imagery Program (NAIP) Data as a Hydrologic Model Input for Local Flood Plain Management. Applied Research Project, Texas State University. http://ecommons.txstate.edu/arp/296/
