= Departures (2011 film) =

- Poster
- Departures (Kavuşma)
- Directed by: Ali Y. Akarçeşme
- Written by: Ali Y. Akarçeşme *contributing writer* Barry M. Putt Jr.
- Produced by: Justin Janoska
- Starring: Gamze Ceylan; Ada Alize Ertem; Temi Hason; Yavuz Hekim
- Cinematography: Dan Brohawn
- Edited by: Enes Abanoz; Patrick Burns Jr. Jeff Morelli
- Music by: Hicistan
- Release date: May 14, 2011 (United States)
- Running time: 12 minutes
- Country: Turkey
- Language: English/Turkish
- Budget: $2,665

Departures (Turkish: Kavuşma) is a 2011 Turkish short film directed by Ali Y. Akarçeşme. The film is twelve minutes long and is about immigration to the United States from Turkey. In order to raise funds for the film, Akarçeşme held a successful Kickstarter campaign that raised $2,665. Departures was named Best Drama at the Brownfish Short Film Festival in New York City in 2011. And he won the Best Director Award at NY ITN Distribution Film Festival. These awards were the first Akarçeşme received while living in the United States. In 2012, the film was screened at New York's Rushes Soho Shorts Film Festival and the Love Your Shorts Film Festival and competed in the Boston Turkish Film Festival. The film also had official selections in various festivals such as NY Soho International, New Hope, Spain's Renderyard, Buffalo Niagara, NJ's Garden State and more.
