= Departure Lake =

Departure Lake may refer to:

- Departure Lake (Ontario), a lake in Cochrane District, Ontario, Canada
  - Departure Lake, Ontario, a place in Haggart Township, Cochrane District, Ontario, Canada
- Lac Departure (Departure Lake), a lake in Côte-Nord region, Quebec, Canada
