= Point of Departure =

Point of Departure or Points of Departure may refer to:

== Film and television ==
- Point of Departure (Wednesday Theatre), a 1966 Australian TV play
- "Points of Departure" (Babylon 5), a 1994 episode

== Literature and plays ==
- Point of Departure, an autobiography by James Cameron (1911–1985)
- The Point of Departure, an autobiography by Robin Cook, 2003
- Point of Departure (play), or Eurydice, by Jean Anouilh, 1941
- Points of Departure, a political memoir by Dalton Camp, 1979
- Point of departure (or divergence), a concept in alternative history literature

== Music ==
- Point of Departure (Gary McFarland album), 1963
- Point of Departure (Andrew Hill album), 1965

== See also ==
- Departure (disambiguation)
- Takeoff, phase of flight from moving along the ground to flying in the air
