= Departure Lounge =

Departure Lounge may refer to:

- Departure lounge, part of an airport
- Departure Lounge (band), a British musical group
- Departure Lounge, a 2006 novel by Chad Taylor

== See also ==
- Departure (disambiguation)
