= African Film and Arts Foundation =

Non-profit organization in Georgia, US

African Film and Arts Foundation (AFAF) Inc is a 501(c)(3) nonprofit media arts organization based in Atlanta, Georgia. Launched in 2020, it develops film and cultural programming that centers African and African Diaspora experiences through storytelling, exhibitions, and educational events. Its primary initiatives include public screenings, curated film festivals, and training programs that focus on African cinema and global Diaspora connections. AFAF currently realizes its mission through its two signature events: the African Film Festival Atlanta (AFFATL) and Cinema for the Culture.

== History ==
AFAF was founded in 2019 by Mojisola Sonoiki, a filmmaker and cultural curator/activist. Prior to AFAF, she founded the Women of Color Arts & Film Festival (WOCAF) Atlanta, GA, which ran from 2005 – 2012 and received a proclamation from the Atlanta city council recognizing the contributions of the Festival in celebrating the contributions of women of color in arts and film. In 2020, AFAF launched its two main programs:

- Cinema for the Culture (CFC): Film Screenings & Masterclass series, a screening and masterclass program.
- African Film Festival Atlanta (AFFATL), an annual festival highlighting African and Diaspora films.

== Programs and initiatives ==
=== African Film Festival Atlanta ===
The African Film Festival Atlanta (AFFATL) was founded in 2020 by award-winning filmmaker and cultural curator Mojisola Sonoiki. The annual event is produced by the African Film & Arts Foundation inc.

Atlanta's status as a media production hub and its sizable African and Caribbean communities contribute to AFFATL's regional significance. Films are shown at venues such as Cinefest Theatre and the Auburn Avenue Research Library.

=== Cinema for the Culture ===
Cinema for the Culture is a film screening and discussion series that presents African films alongside community conversations and educational events. The series includes screenings, Q&As with directors and workshops.

It has featured critically acclaimed films such as You Will Die at Twenty, SIRA and The Apollo, often in partnership with institutions like Georgia Humanities and Francophonie Atlanta.

You Will Die at Twenty (Sudan), directed by Amjad Abu Alala, is Sudan's first official submission to the Academy Awards (2021) and winner of the Lion of the Future Award for Best Debut Feature at the Venice Film Festival. The film is a coming-of-age story set against the backdrop of rural Sudan, exploring the weight of fate through the eyes of a young boy living under a prophecy of early death.

SIRA (Burkina Faso), directed by Apolline Traoré, is a film shot in the Mauritanian desert. It tells the harrowing yet resilient story of a young woman navigating survival and resistance in the face of extremist violence in the Sahel.

The Apollo (USA), directed by Roger Ross Williams, provides a sweeping documentary history of New York City's Apollo Theater. The film, which screened during AFAF's partnership with AfroCon in 2021, traces the cultural and political legacy of the venue that launched the careers of artists such as Billie Holiday, Aretha Franklin, Ella Fitzgerald and Stevie Wonder. The screening included a special conversation with Billy Mitchell, known as "Mr. Apollo" and longtime historian of the theater.

=== African Reel ===
African Reel is a multimedia blog and video interview series spotlighting African creatives in film, TV, literature and digital media. It serves as both an educational archive and a storytelling platform, celebrating the global impact of African and Diaspora voices. The series has featured notable figures such as Chadwick Boseman, Thuso Mbedu and Tomi Adeyemi, as well as trailblazers like Terri J. Vaughn, a three-time NAACP Image Award-winning actress and producer, and Menelik Shabazz, a pioneer of Black British cinema. Other profiled talents include Regé-Jean Page, Daniel Kaluuya, Genevieve Nnaji, Michaela Coel, Ladj Ly, and John Boyega, each contributing to rich narratives that reflect the diversity, resilience and creativity of African-descended communities worldwide.

=== AFAF Film Fund ===
The AFAF Film Fund, currently in development, is intended to support films that explore connections between Africans and members of the Diaspora. It emphasizes themes of cultural memory, identity and reconciliation.

== Leadership ==
Mojisola Sonoiki is the founder of the African Film & Arts Foundation Inc (AFAF) and Festival Director of the African Film Festival Atlanta. She holds a screenwriting certificate from NYU and is the creator of the docu interview series Indigo Tongues.

== Recognition ==
- In 2023, AFAF was commended by Representative Segun Adeyina of the Georgia House of Representatives for its contributions through AFFATL.
- Supporters and partners have included Georgia Humanities, Alliance Française d'Atlanta, Cinefest Film Theatre, Georgia State University (GSU), the Auburn Avenue Research Library on African American Culture & History (AARL), and Francophonie Atlanta.
- Media coverage has appeared on platforms like UrbanGeekz and MSN.
