= Third Street Film Festival =

The Third Street Film Festival is an independent film festival located in Baton Rouge, Louisiana. The Third Street Film Festival held its inaugural event in December 2011. The second Third Street Film Festival took place in 2012 at the Manship Theatre in Baton Rouge. The Festival's focus is to promote, foster, and unite independent filmmakers by showcasing their work.

== History ==
The Third Street Film Festival was the first independent film festival held in the capital city of Louisiana. Its films were played to sold-out crowds.
