= The Departure (short story) =

Literary work by Franz Kafka

"The Departure" (German: "Der Aufbruch") is a short story by Franz Kafka. Precisely when it was written is unknown, but it was probably sometime between February 1920 and February 1921. It was published only posthumously, appearing in Beschreibung eines Kampfes: Novellen, Skizzen, Aphorismen aus dem Nachlaß in 1936. Max Brod edited the volume, and is credited with giving this piece its name.

The piece takes the form of a conversation between a servant and his master. The master orders his servant to saddle his horse, but the servant fails to understand. The master then hears a trumpet sound, which his servant does not hear. The master sets about to leave, and the servant asks where he is going. The man's only answer is that his goal is to get away from his present location, rather than to seek out any particular destination.
