= Tombstone Western Film Festival and Symposium =

Film festival held in Tombstone, Arizona

Coordinates: 31.4257°N 110.0353°W

- Location: Tombstone, Arizona, U.S.
- Language: International
- Website: tombstonewesternfilm.com

The Tombstone Western Film Festival and Symposium founded in 2001 was held in July in Tombstone, Arizona, a historic western mining town (and later ghost town) in the U.S. celebrated in western films as the site of the legendary Gunfight at the O.K. Corral between Wyatt Earp and the Clantons and McLaurys.

The program in the first year was devoted to retellings of tales from Tombstone, the second year to classic TV Western. Organizers hoped the festival would allow the town to cash in on various film and TV depictions of events in the town's history. They invited actors such as Hugh O'Brian and Harry Carey Jr. to the event. The 2002 also included book discussions and was funded by the city government rather than private funding.

The 2003 event did not occur as the organizers participated in the Warren Earp Days festival in nearby Willcox instead.

It was reported that the 2005 iteration of the festival would be its last, as the backers had failed to find funding to continue. A reunion of the cast of Little House on the Prairie also occurred at that year's event. Attendees included Melissa Gilbert and Alison Arngrim.
