= Baton Rouge Jewish Film Festival =

The Baton Rouge Jewish Film Festival (BRJFF) is an annual Jewish film festival held in Baton Rouge, Louisiana in association with the Jewish Federation of Greater Baton Rouge. Five or six Jewish films are shown at each Festival.

The ninth Festival was held from January 14 to January 18, 2015.
