= Cinefest Fairfield =

Film festival in Fairfield, Connecticut, US

Coordinates: 41.1415°N 73.2567°W

Cinefest Fairfield is an annual film festival since 2005 featuring short films by students, alumni and faculty of Fairfield University in Fairfield, Connecticut, held in association with the Fairfield Community Theatre. The festival is sponsored by the Department of Visual and Performing Arts and showcases its innovative New Media Program.

== Vision for Cinefest Fairfield ==
"CineFest Fairfield will become a notable annual event for the University and for Fairfield County," Fr. James Mayzik, S.J., Director of the New Media major and Media Center said. "Fairfield students will emerge as leaders within the region and the nation for their creativity and talent in film, television and radio within this exciting new program."

== Cinefest Fairfield 2007 ==
Cinefest Fairfield 2007 took place on May 3, 2007, at the Fairfield Community Theatre on Post Road in Fairfield, Connecticut. The following six awards were presented to Fairfield University students and alumni:

Category	Title	Recipients
Best Cinematography	"Shoes"	Jared Mezzocchi '07, Writer/Director; Scott Wagner '04, Cinematographer
Best Writing	"Tick"	Michael Livingston '07, Writer/Director
Best Editing	"Praying to Hendrix"	Brad Martocello '07, Writer/Director/Editor; Stefen Piccione '05, Writer/Director
Best Directing	"Fugue"	Patrick Ginnetty '07, Writer/Director/Editor
Best Film	"Fugue"	Patrick Ginnetty '07, Writer/Director/Editor
Audience Choice Award	"Fugue"	Patrick Ginnetty '07, Writer/Director/Editor

== Cinefest Fairfield 2013 ==
Cinefest Fairfield 2013 took place on May 3, 2013, at the Quick Center for the Arts, on Fairfield University Campus. The following awards were shown and awards were given to the following films.

Category	Title	Recipients
Best Cinematography	"My Brother's Hand"	Dan Dibellai '13, Writer/Director; Joe Pellegrino '13, Cinematographer
Best Producer	"The Road Ahead of US"	Dan Bruno "13, Producer
Best Fiction Film	"Children of The Moon"	Dan Dibellai '13, Director; Joe Pellegrino '13, Writer/Cinematographer
Best Sound Design	"Terminal"	Adam Power'13 Director, Editor; Jenn Calhoun'15 Audio Recordist; Mark Prescott '15
Best Producer	"The Road Ahead of US"	Dan Bruno "13, Producer
Best Production Design	"Dirgio"	Julia Holtof '13, Writer/Director/Editor; Eve Seiter'14
Audience Choice Award	"George"	Jack Galvin '13, Writer/Director/Editor
Kenni Nwajugu Award	"Terminal"	Adam Power'13 Director, Editor
Best Alternative Video Award	"You Are What You Eat"	Christina Dunne '13, Writer/Director/Editor
