= Chinatown Film Festival =

Asian film festival in New York City

The Chinatown Film Festival (CFF) was a major international competitive Asian film festival in New York City with the aim of organizing an annual film festival to promote cultural exchanges between Asia and the rest of the world. The inaugural festival was planned for 2008.

== History ==
The CFF idea was started in 2005 by Simone Tarantino, Edward J. Cuccia and Ammy Lim, who were living and working in Chinatown and realized the need for greater cultural communication between the West and Asia, aiming to serve as a role model for the rest of the world. In 2006, the CFF began partnerships with various cultural associations and community patrons to begin the planning for the various aspects of an international cultural event. The CFF officially became incorporated as a non-profit corporation on December 7, 2006.

== Mission ==
The mission of the film festival was to increase the exposure of Asian culture, while uniting it with other international cultures. It takes place in various venues through Manhattan's Chinatown, and aims to use the highly accessible medium of film to create a new point of contact with Asian cultures, as well as to provide a springboard for greater rebirth of New York's Chinatown, giving it a new international appeal to locals, visitors, businesses, and community members.

== Events ==
=== 2007 Chinatown Fashion Show Gala ===
A gala in November 2007 at Jing Fung Restaurant, with over 700 attendees, helped raise funds for the 2008 festival.

=== 2008 Earthquake Benefit ===
In June 2008, the Chinatown Film Festival organized a concert to benefit China earthquake victims.

=== 2008 Festival ===
The inaugural festival in 2008 called for films created in Asia and not yet screened in the United States. The festival theme was The Bridge: Connecting Cultures Through Film in the Heart of Asian Traditions. Categories of films to be accepted included Feature Length, Documentary, Short Subject, Experimental Project, and Animation / Manga, as well as an Outsider category to showcase non-competitive films. A total of 5 films would be screened in each of the five main categories.

The Golden Dragon Award would be given by a panel of journalists, film festival directors, and professionals based on style, technique, creative innovation, and execution. From these, five winners will be chosen as the top filmmakers of the festival, to receive the Grand Award and a special outdoor screening. A Bridge Award and an Audience Award would be given out in each category. Other awards included: Best Production, Best New Director, Best Screenplay, Best Cinematography, Best Editing, Best Production Design, Best Original Score, Best Actress, Best Actor.
