= Love Your Shorts Film Festival =

- Location: Sanford, Florida, U.S.
- Founded: 2010
- Language: International
- Website: http://www.loveyourshorts.com

The Love Your Shorts Film Festival is an annual film festival held each February in Sanford, Florida that showcases short films of 30 minutes or less from around the world. The festival features screenings, filmmaker panels, networking events, and awards presentations. Events take place primarily at the historic Ritz Theater in downtown Sanford. The 17th annual festival is scheduled to take place February 4–7, 2027.

== History ==
The festival was founded in 2010, with its inaugural event held in February 2011 at the Greater Sanford Regional Chamber of Commerce. Due to increasing submissions and audience attendance, the festival relocated in 2012 to the Ritz Theater at the Wayne Densch Performing Arts Center, a restored theater originally opened in the early 1920s.

Since its founding, Love Your Shorts has continued annually and has expanded into a four-day event featuring numerous screening blocks, filmmaker networking opportunities, and community activities. 2027 will mark the 17th edition of the fest.

== Format ==
Love Your Shorts screens only short films, each under 30 minutes in length. Films are organized into themed blocks, which have included categories such as comedy, drama, documentary, animation, science fiction/horror, family-friendly programming, international shorts, and “Florida Flavor,” which highlights films made in Florida or by Florida-based filmmakers.

Audience members vote for their favorite films within each block. Block winners advance to a final “Best of the Fest” screening, where a panel of judges selects overall award winners. Winning films receive the festival’s signature award, known as the “Monroe,” a metal art piece named after nearby Lake Monroe.

Screenings are typically followed by question-and-answer sessions with attending filmmakers. The festival also hosts moderated panels focused on filmmaking techniques and industry topics as part of its Education Night.

== Filmmaker participation ==
Filmmakers whose works are selected for screening are provided a range of hospitality and networking opportunities during the festival weekend. These include:

- A full weekend pass granting access to all festival screenings and events.
- Access to a dedicated filmmaker lounge throughout the weekend, with complimentary refreshments.
- An opening-night party for filmmakers, sponsors, and volunteers, featuring catered food and live music.
- A community-hosted Saturday morning breakfast for visiting filmmakers.
- Question-and-answer sessions following screenings.
- A “Best of the Fest” block selected by a panel of judges, followed by an awards presentation and after-party open to attendees.

== Venue ==
The primary venue for the festival is the Ritz Theater at the Wayne Densch Performing Arts Center in downtown Sanford. Originally opened in 1923 and later restored, the theater seats nearly 600 patrons and serves as a cultural landmark in Seminole County.

== Reception ==
The festival has developed a regional reputation within Central Florida as a well-attended short film event with active audience participation and filmmaker engagement.

Based on participant reviews, Love Your Shorts has been listed among FilmFreeway’s “Top 100 Best Reviewed Festivals,” a distinction determined by filmmaker ratings on the submission platform.
