= Miami 48-Hour Film Project =

Miami Film Contest

The Miami 48-Hour Film Project is an annual short film contest held in Miami, Florida, and has been running since 2005. It is the Miami Chapter of the parent 48 Hour Film Project, which holds annual contests in over 96 cities worldwide.

== Categories ==
Each team receives 4 elements to be included in the film: (1) a character, (2) a prop, (3) a line of dialogue and (4) a genre. These are selected at random at the start of the clock and are unique to each group. The final film must be produced and submitted within 48 hours.

=== List of genres ===
- Comedy
- Dark Comedy
- Detective/Cop
- Drama
- Fantasy
- Film de Femme
- Horror
- Mockumentary
- Musical or Western
- Romance
- Sci Fi
- Silent Film
- Thriller/Suspense
- Vacation or Holiday Film

=== List of awards ===
- Best Film
- Best Directing
- Best Cinematography
- Best Writing
- Best Editing
- Best Use of Character
- Best Use of Prop
- Best Use of Line
- Best Ensemble Acting
- Best Choreography
- Best Costumes
- Best Graphics
- Best Music Score
- Best Sound Design
- Best Special Effects

== Awards ==
Of the multiple categoric awards, one film is selected for overall "Best Film" and submitted to a jury for consideration against other City Winners for the competition year. The jury's selection from among these films is named the year's winner and is honored at Filmapalooza, the finale festival for the 48 Hour Film Project.

=== List of Best Film ===
- 2012 TBD
- 2011: "77" by Electroscope
- 2010: "Palindrome" by DC Dogs
- 2009: “Riddle of the Red Man-Eater” by Timestitch
- 2008: "Odie & Troy: A Film Maker's Odyssey" by Round Two Productions
- 2007: "A Monkton Family Christmas" by N Pictures
- 2006: "Maten al Payaso" by Team The Afafas
- 2005: "Trivial Things That People Say in Normal Letters" by CCEF
