= Lookout Wild Film Festival =

Annual film festival in Tennessee, US

- Frequency: Annual
- Inaugurated: 2013

The Lookout Wild Film Festival (LWFF) is a film festival based in Chattanooga, Tennessee. The LWFF is a 4-day, 6 session event showcasing conservation and outdoor adventure films from around the world. Films are submitted via FilmFreeway and/or selected by a volunteer screening team. LWFF is a member of the Film Festival Alliance.

== History ==
LWFF originated in 2013. The LWFF is a 501(c)(3) non profit organization and has an elected Board of Directors.

In 2013 and 2014 LWFF was held in the Centennial Theater at the Chattanooga Choo-Choo Hotel.

In 2015 the LWFF moved to the Robert Kirk Walker Theater in the Soldiers and Sailors Memorial Auditorium.

In 2019 the LWFF moved to the Tivoli Theater.

In 2020 the LWFF added a Photography Competition.

In 2021, due to the COVID-19 pandemic and the inability to hold indoor events, LWFF adapted by presenting fifteen 60-minute, free film nights at Miller Park in downtown Chattanooga, every Friday during the Nightfall Music Series.

In 2022, LWFF added the Dale Greybeard Sanders Perseverance Award (The Stoney), an annual accolade bestowed upon the most inspiring person in the films. Recipients include Dale Sanders (2022), Nimblewill Nomad (2022) Sunny Yang (2023), Lane Lamoreaux (2024) and Mike Adair (2025). LWFF also hosted the Reel Rock film tour and organized four free film events in the mid-summer period to raise funds for local non-profit organizations.

In 2023, due to renovations at the Tivoli, LWFF returned to the Walker Theater. The festival featured the world premieres of two films: "Greybeard - The Man, The Myth, The Mississippi" and "A Dream of Flying". The lead characters, producers, directors, and filmmakers from both films attended a Q&A session. Additional attendees to the filmmaker Q&A came from Iran via the United Kingdom, British Columbia (CA), as well as Minnesota and Montana in the US. LWFF once again hosted the Reel Rock Tour and the Paddling Film Festival. LWFF also released a craft beer called Watch This through Wanderlinger Brewing Company as a fundraiser for the festival.

In 2024, LWFF showed more than 60 films from around the world including 4 locally focused films. LWFF hosted the world premier of "Flowing Air" from Big Cedar Media. The 2024 'Stoney' award was presented to Lane Lamoureux. LWFF will be hosting the Reel Rock Tour as a fundraiser demonstrating the commitment to give back to the local community. In addition LWFF will be presenting several tour dates at locations across the US.

Attendance and location
Year	Attendance	location
2013	330	Chattanooga Choo Choo hotel
2014	1400	Chattanooga Choo Choo
2015	1700	Robert Kirk Walker Theater
2016	2700	Robert Kirk Walker Theater (includes a session sold out at 851 attendees)
2017	3300	Robert Kirk Walker Theater (includes two sessions sold out at 851 attendees)
2018	3800	Robert Kirk Walker Theater (includes two sessions sold out at 851 attendees)
2019	4000	Tivoli Theater
2020	4400	Tivoli Theater (Pre-Covid. Includes first ever Tivoli Theater film event sell-out of 1238 attendees)
2021	2000	No indoor festival due to Covid, estimated over 15 weeks
2022	4100	Robert Kirk Walker Theater
2023	4200	Robert Kirk Walker Theater
2024	4200	Robert Kirk Walker Theater
2025	4000	The Signal
2026	~	U.T.C. Fine Arts Center - Hayes Hall
2027	~	U.T.C. Fine Arts Center - Hayes Hall & Ward Theater

== Awards ==
- Fan Favorite - Throughout the festival, LWFF allows attendees to vote for their fan favorite film.
- The Loggy - an internally selected film award, in the categories of Feature Film, Southeastern Film, Environmental Film, Short Film, Adventure, and Exploration Film.
- The Stoney - annual award presented to the most inspiring person in the films.

== Stoney Award Recipients ==
- 2021 - Dale 'Greybeard' Sanders (Source to Sea)
- 2022 - Sunny 'Nimblewill Nomad' Eberhart (The Last Last Hike)
- 2023 - Sunny Yang (The Crux)
- 2024 - Lane Lamoreaux (Flowing Air)
- 2025 - Mike Adair (Trash Panda)
- 2026 - Rob Shaver (The Life We Have)

== Loggy award Winners ==
=== 2026 ===
- Best Short film - Scraped Knees
- Best Feature film - A Life Outside: American Mountain Guides
- Best Southeastern film - Shut Up Legs, We Skiing Bama!
- Best Adventure film - 2 Legs is 2 Easy
- Best Environmental film - A Guide To Fighting For Wild Rivers
- Best Documentary film - Best Day Ever

=== 2025 ===
- Best Short film - Unseen Peaks
- Best Feature film - Climbing into Life
- Best Southeastern film - Climb Malawi
- Best Adventure film - A Little Bit Different
- Best Environmental film - The Grand Salmon
- Best Documentary film - Girls Riding High

=== 2024 ===
- Best Short film - The Balkans Mirage
- Best Feature film - Full Circle
- Best Southeastern film - A Couple of Screws Loose
- Best Adventure film - Earthside
- Best Environmental film - Clear Day Thunder
- Best Documentary film - Yamnuska - A Ragged Edge
- Best Exploration award - Subterranean
- Director's Award - Champions of the Golden Valley

=== 2023 ===
- Best Short film - Crux
- Best Feature film - Not Alone
- Best Southeastern film - Dream Of Flying
- Best Exploration film - Truth And Dignity Project
- Best Adventure film - The Illness
- Best Environmental film - If You Give A Beach A Bottle
- Best Documentary film - Elevated

=== 2022 ===
- Best Short film -
- Best Feature film - The River Runner
- Best Southeastern film - The Last Last Hike
- Best Adventure film - Out of the Blue
- Best Environmental film - Katie
- Best Documentary film -

=== 2021 ===
- Best Short film - Camel Find Water
- Best Feature film - High Hopes
- Best Southeastern film - Bigger Than Me
- Best Adventure film - Mount Logan
- Best Environmental film - I Am Vital
- Best Documentary film - People of Water

=== 2020 ===
- Best Short film - Burro
- Best Feature film - Zabardast
- Best Southeastern film - Gone Tomorrow: Kentucky Ice Climbing
- Best Adventure film - RJ Ripper
- Best Environmental film - Into the Canyon
- Best Documentary film - Pathfinder

=== 2019 ===
- Best Short film - A New View of the Moon
- Best Feature film - Dirtbag: The Legend of Fred Beckey
- Best Southeastern film - Safe Haven
- Best Adventure film - The Frenchy
- Best Environmental film - Bears of Durango
- Best Documentary film - How to Run 100 Miles

=== 2018 ===
- Best Short film -
- Best Feature film -
- Best Southeastern film -
- Best Adventure film -
- Best Environmental film -
- Best Documentary film -

=== 2017 ===
- Best Short film - Mile 19
- Best Feature film - Sea Gypsies: The Far Side of the World
- Best Southeastern film -
- Best Adventure film -
- Best Environmental film -
- Best Documentary film -

=== 2016 ===
- Best Short film - Denali
- Best Feature film - Unbranded
- Best Exploration film - Climbing Ice
- Best Adventure film - The Mont Rebei Project
- Best Environmental film - Martin’s Boat
- Best Documentary film - The Great Alone
- Best Timelapse - Eastern Skies

=== 2015 ===
- Best Short film - Slomo
- Best Feature film - And Then We Swam
- Best Adventure film - Sufferfest II
- Best Exploration film - Nobody’s River
- Best Environmental film - Delta Dawn
- Best Documentary film - Mending The Line
- Directors Choice Award - The Last Dragons

=== 2014 ===
- Best Short film - Bike Lanes
- Best Feature film - Congo: The Grand Inga Project
- Best Adventure film - Sea of Rock
- Best Exploration film - North of the Sun
- Best Environmental film - Stand
- Best Documentary film - Who Owns Water?

=== 2013 ===
- Best Short film -
- Best Feature film -
- Best Southeastern film - Kudzu Vine
- Best Adventure film - Cascada
- Best Environmental film -
- Best Documentary film -

== Notable films ==
- The Alpinist
- The River Runner
- Greybeard - The Man, The Myth, The Mississippi (World Premier)
- A Dream of Flying (World Premier)
- Flowing Air (World Premier)
