= Palm Springs Festival of Festivals =

Palm Springs Festival of Festivals used to take place in October/November Palm Springs, California.

It was established in 2001 by Craig Prater, Executive Director, as a showcase of short and feature films as a challenge to the longer-standing Palm Springs International Film Festival, of which Prater had previously been director.

The festival aimed to attract all ages of the community, including a four-day International Children's Film Festival with a youth panel of jurors and awards created by elementary school children to acknowledge participants. All profits from the Children's Festival were donated to the Children's Museum of the Desert.

The Palm Springs chapter of Women in Film sponsored the award ceremony. Awards included Best Female Director, Best New Director, Hadassah Award, Passion Latino Award, Best Jewish Film, Diversity Awareness Award, Audience Awards, and the Vision Award for the best digital film.
