= Lac Departure =

Lake in Quebec, Canada

- Departure Lake
- Location in Quebec
- Location: Côte-Nord, Quebec
- Coordinates: 51°39′07″N 57°29′05″W
- Basin countries: Canada
- Max. length: 530 m (1,740 ft)
- Max. width: 180 m (590 ft)
- Surface elevation: 275 m (902 ft)

Lac Departure (transl. Departure Lake) is a lake in Petit-Mécatina, Le Golfe-du-Saint-Laurent Regional County Municipality, in the Côte-Nord region of Quebec, Canada. It is in the Gulf of Saint Lawrence drainage basin.

The lake has one unnamed inflow, at the north, and one unnamed outflow at the south. That outflow eventually reaches Lac Ruel, which empties via the Rivière de Salmon Bay to Baie Salmon on the Gulf of Saint Lawrence.
