= Bastard Film Encounter =

The Bastard Film Encounter (BFE) is a US-based film festival and conference established in 2013 which encourages the viewing and discussion of films and videos which are "poorly executed, offensive in content, or document the offensive." These films have often been orphaned by their original creators or the institutions in which they are held as well as the archivist(s) charged with the film or video's care-taking. A bastard film is sometimes described as the “terribly-behaved cousin of the orphan film”. The participants and attendees are usually archivists, scholars, librarians, academics, social historians, enthusiasts, film researchers, and collectors in the world of film and video content. Over the weekend event, attendees will be introduced to films, view them, and a discussion will follow." BFE has been described as "Equal parts endurance test, group therapy session, academic conference, and absurdist jamboree..."

== Purpose ==
Film festivals are a form of curation and typically focus on a particular genre, length, or specific region. However, there are some films that are not easily categorized and possibly defy conventional tastes and opinions. The Bastard Film Encounter has allowed for a reevaluation of some of these ignored or hidden moving images. BFE's purpose is to question the "why" of these "bastard" films as well as the "what" to do with them in a learned and academic setting, enabling experts in the field to discuss the issues of both past and future historical context, ethics and consent, and distribution of time and attention in regards to these sometimes dismissed and often forgotten films. Archivists and scholars are pushed to question their responsibility as stewards of film, culture, and history by reexamining what items in a collection have benefited from scarce resources in the past, and whether there is room for the "bastard" film to also be preserved, catalogued, digitized, and publicized. BFE stimulates discussion regarding the purpose of media archives, how they should they be organized, whom should they serve, whose story they tell, and how they tell it.

Bastard films also generates discussion about the daily intake of visual media, not just around academic topics. "We consume televisual content that’s hard to watch and rewires our understanding of humanity on a nearly daily basis, whether that be the social media livestreams from members of extremist groups, law enforcement body-cam footage, or news reports from the latest presidential rally. The challenge of how to handle the things we can’t unsee isn’t confined to history, it’s a fundamental component of being a 21st-century digital citizen."

== Creation and history ==
The event name comes from the word ‘bastard’ (something irregular or inferior) and the word ‘encounter’ (unexpectedly come across something).

The inaugural Bastard Film Encounter was held in April 2013 in Raleigh, North Carolina. It was co-founded by Skip Elsheimer, founder at A/V Geeks LLC; Marsha Gordon, Professor of Film Studies, North Carolina State University; and Dwight Swanson, independent specialist in amateur film and regional film production. The founders were inspired to examine the "bastards" of orphan films.

After an Orphan Film Symposium which celebrates things that need to be saved, Elsheimer, Gordon, and Swanson asked, "But what about the bastards?"

The Orphan Film Symposium introduced us to films that had been orphaned by their creators or caretakers. We hope to expand on this idea by looking at films that are bastards—ill-conceived or received; embarrassing or beyond the bounds of acceptability; poor in conception or execution; undesirable to those who should be caring for them; proof of something that should have never happened. The aim of the Bastard Film Encounter is to bring these misbegotten moving images out of the closet and begin to address what these films are, how they are kept and ignored (and if they really should be), if and why they might matter, and what role they might play in archives and in studies of the moving image.

— Bastard Film Encounter

Like other more traditional film festivals and academic conferences, there is a call for proposals and a carefully planned schedule of presentations.

The Bastard Film Encounter took place biannually in Raleigh from 2013 through 2017, after which it was relocated to Baltimore, Maryland for the 2019 BFE. Stephanie Sapienza, project manager of the Maryland Institute for Technology in the Humanities, spearheaded the relocation in an organizational role. The BFE screenings and discussions typically take place in non-traditional meeting spaces, with a particular fondness for bars with performance space. The organizers aim to foster an intimate space where people can discuss the uncomfortable and events become part "endurance test, group therapy session, academic conference, and absurdist jamboree". Attendees are also allowed to discuss difficult topics such as materials in archives that the public will never see. The event provides a space to discuss these loaded subjects.

The goal of the encounter is to encourage discussion over the cultural and historical worth of each film, both now as well as in the future. Participants debate whether there is room in the archival sphere for films which may appear to be of limited (or non-existent) artistic, scholarly, historic, or cultural value.

The Bastard Film Encounter always hosts a keynote speaker. Keynote speakers have included Dino Everett, archivist at USC Hugh M. Hefner Moving Image Archive; Andrew Lampert, filmmaker and director; and Brian L. Frye, associate professor of law at University of Kentucky College of Law; Snowden Becker, MLIS program director at UCLA Department of Information Studies; and Liz Coffey, ex-film conservator at Harvard Film Archive.

=== Unusual characteristics ===
The Bastard Film Encounter eschews the typical culture of professional conferences and has created certain light-hearted traditions to provide balance and relief from the unusual material being viewed and ingested by the audience members and participants.

Between films, talent breaks are implemented to provide relief and there is great pressure to participate. In 2013, as a respite from two days of viewing challenging and difficult material, film collector Greg Pierce spontaneously allowed artist/performer/nurse Joan Vorderbruggen to remove his stitches on stage with a musical "soundtrack" provided by archival producer and researcher Rich Remsberg and his banjo. The event was recorded, thus creating a "bastard film" during the Bastard Film Encounter and a tough to top "talent" entry.

Opening night is Bastards Karaoke Night with participants performing with The Bastards Karaoke Band.

Powerpoint presentations are not allowed during the conference presentations but an overhead projector can be provided for transparencies.

Many of the presentations enforce a social media black-out for reasons of permissions, ethics, consent, and sensitivity.

The old-fashioned hourglass timer's purpose is to keep presenters at the 5 minutes or less mark.

Alcohol and dark humor are commonly indulged tonics during BFE.
