= Wayne Densch Performing Arts Center =

- Ritz Theater / Helen Stairs Theatre
- U.S. National Register of Historic Places
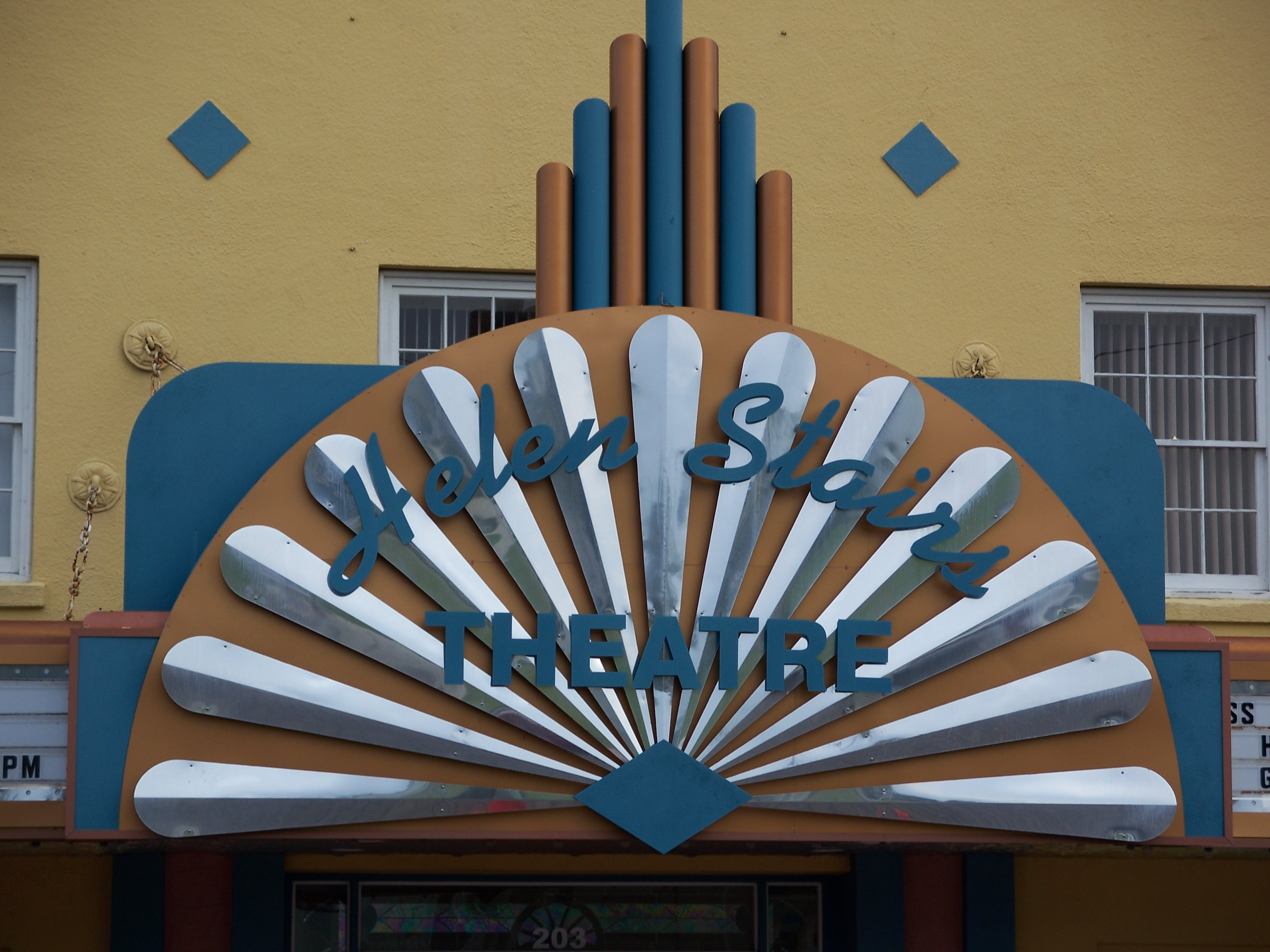

- Location within Florida Location within the United States
- Location: Sanford, Florida, USA
- Coordinates: 28°48′37″N 81°16′1″W
- Built: 1923
- Architectural style: Masonry Vernacular
- NRHP reference No.: 00001130
- Added to NRHP: January 29, 2001

The Ritz Theater (also known as the Milane Theatre or the Helen Stairs Theatre) is a historic theatre in Sanford, Florida, United States. It is located at 201 South Magnolia Avenue. On January 29, 2001, it was added to the U.S. National Register of Historic Places. After getting donations from Wayne Densch it has now been named the Wayne Densch Performing Arts Center.

== Gallery ==
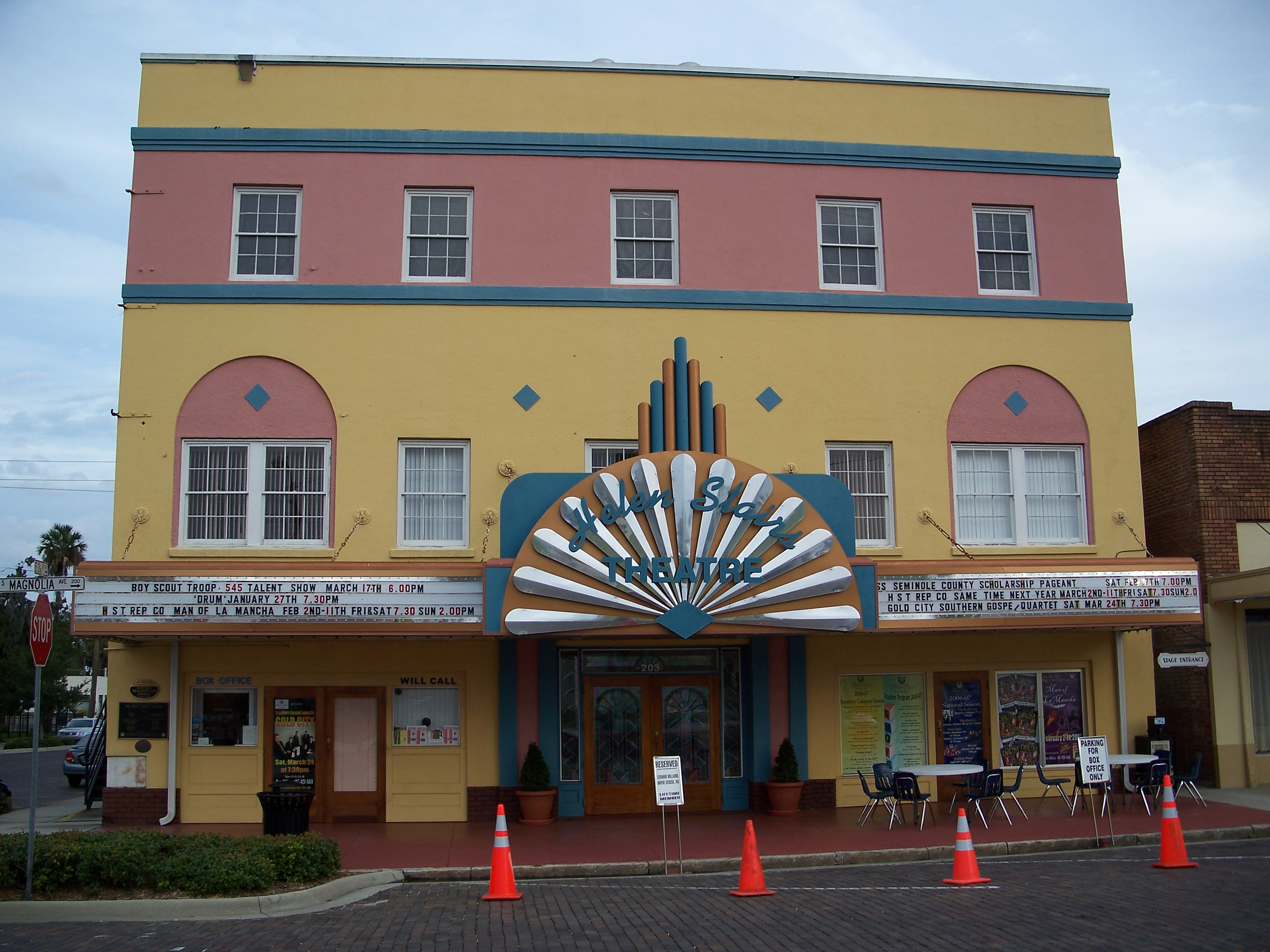
