= Flood opening =

Technique for mitigating the effects of flooding on structures

A flood opening or flood vent (also styled floodvent) is an orifice in an enclosed structure intended to allow the free passage of water between the interior and exterior.

== United States ==
In the United States, flood openings are used to provide for the automatic equalization of hydrostatic pressure on either side of a wall. Building codes usually require the installation of flood openings in the walls of structures located in A-type flood zones recognized by the Federal Emergency Management Agency. Various agencies in the United States define necessary characteristics for flood openings. The NFIP Regulations and Building Codes require that any residential building constructed in Flood Zone Type A have the lowest floor, including basements, elevated to or above the Base Flood Elevation (BFE). Enclosed areas are permitted under elevated buildings provided that they meet certain use restrictions and construction requirements such as the installation of flood vents to allow for the automatic entry and exit of flood waters. The wet floodproofing technique is required for residential buildings.

=== Engineered vs. non-engineered openings ===
Most regulatory authorities in the United States that offer requirements for flood openings define two major classes of opening: engineered, and non-engineered. The requirements for non-engineered openings are typically stricter, defining necessary characteristics for aspects ranging from overall size of each opening, to allowable screening or other coverage options, to number and placement of openings. Engineered openings ignore many of the requirements, depending on the particular regulatory authority. To qualify as an engineered opening, testing and/or certification by a qualified agency (varying from regulator to regulator, and indicated below where appropriate) is required.

=== American Society of Civil Engineers definition ===
The American Society of Civil Engineers (ASCE) requirements apply to any structure that is not dry flood-proofed and which is in the mapped flood zone. It calls for openings in load-bearing foundation walls located below the mapped flood elevation. Where non-engineered openings are used, each opening must be at least three inches in diameter, and have no screen or other cover that interferes with the transition of water between interior and exterior. The total net open area of all flood openings in the structure must be equal to or greater than one square inch, per square foot of footprint of the enclosed area—though no fewer than two openings, total, which must be located on different walls. Openings must be placed such that the bottom of each opening is no more than one foot above the adjacent ground level.

In lieu of these requirements, engineered openings must conform to a performance standard: during a flood with a rate of rise/fall of five feet per hour, the difference between interior and exterior flood water levels in an enclosure using the engineered openings must not be greater than one foot.

=== International Building Code (IBC) ===
The International Building Code refers to the American Society of Civil Engineer requirements for both non-engineered and engineered flood openings.

=== International Residential Code (IRC) ===
The International Residential Code requirements vary mildly from revision to revision, but require that entry and exit of floodwater be provided for in accordance with the requirements of the ASCE. These requirements apply for both non-engineered and engineered flood openings.

=== FEMA ===
While the Federal Emergency Management Agency does not have de jure authority over the building code, it maintains crucial influence over flood opening standards through its administration of the National Flood Insurance Program (NFIP). By controlling the standards for nearly all flood insurance in the United States, the NFIP exerts exceptional de facto authority over many aspects of floodplain construction. The FEMA (and, thus, NFIP) requirements for non-engineered openings are similar to requirements from the American Society of Civil Engineers. Unlike the ASCE, FEMA requires the placement of openings such that the bottom of each opening is no more than one foot above the higher of the adjacent ground level, or the interior foundation slab height.

For engineered openings, FEMA offers two subclassifications: individual certification openings, and openings with International Code Council Evaluation Service (ICC-ES) Evaluation Reports. Individual certification openings are offered for use when, "[f]or architectural or other reasons, building designers or owners may prefer to use unique or individually designed openings or devices". In such cases, an architect or engineer may provide certification including the professional's signature and applied seal. The certification must include a "statement certifying that the openings are designed to automatically equalize hydrostatic flood loads on exterior walls by allowing the automatic entry and exit of floodwaters in accordance with the...design requirements"; "[d]escription of the range of flood characteristics tested or computed for which the certification is valid, such as rates of rise and fall of floodwaters"; and "[d]escription of the installation requirements and limitations that, if not followed, will void the certification". The nature of the "live seal" requirement means that each structure containing an individual certification opening must have a separate certification, even if the opening is identical to that used in another structure.

The alternative subclassification is an opening that carries certification through the ICC-ES. According to FEMA, "Evaluation Reports are issued only after the ICC-ES performs technical evaluations of documentation submitted by a manufacturer, including technical design reports, certifications, and testing that demonstrate code compliance and performance." The report must include a statement concerning the purpose of the opening tested; a description of the characteristics tested; and a description of installation requirements. FEMA allows a copy of the report to be used as a blanket certification of any project including an ICC-ES certified opening, in contrast to the requirements of an individual certification opening.

==== AC364-1006-R1 ====
AC364-1006-R1 documents the ICC-ES's testing standards for flood openings, including specifications for a dual-chambered testing tank. While the requirements for the opening itself are based on ASCE 24, the substance of the test adds new layers of performance expectation. Under these requirements, the opening must activate before water level is one foot above the bottom of the opening, under conditions of 50 and 300 gallons per minute flooding, at a minimum of five foot per hour rate of rise. Additionally, water levels on the testing tank's "interior" and "exterior" portions must at no point differ more than one foot. To gauge performance against waterborne debris, leaves and grass clippings are added to both chambers of the tank.

== See also ==
- Culvert
