= List of film festivals =

This is a list of existing major film festivals, sorted by continent.

The world's oldest film festival is the Mostra internazionale d'arte cinematografica (Venice Film Festival), while the most prestigious film festivals in the world, known as the "Big Three", are (listed chronologically according to the date of foundation): Venice, Cannes and Berlin. The most prestigious film festivals in North America are Sundance and Toronto.

== Africa ==
Name	Est.	Location	Country	Type	Notes
Africa International Film Festival	2010	Calabar	Nigeria	International	
Afro-Asian Film Festival	1958	Tashkent; Cairo; Jakarta	Uzbekistan; Egypt; Indonesia	International	Held during 1958, 1960, and 1964
Alexandria Mediterranean Film Festival	1979	Alexandria	Egypt	International	
Amakula International Film Festival	2004	Kampala	Uganda	International	
Aswan International Women's Film Festival	2017	Aswan	Egypt	International	
Black Star International Film Festival	2015	Accra	Ghana	International	
Cabo Verde International Film Festival	2010	Sal	Cape Verde	National	
Cairo International Film Festival	1976	Cairo	Egypt	International	
Cairo International Women's Film Festival	2008	Cairo	Egypt	International	Introducing the works of female filmmakers.
Carthage Film Festival	1966	Carthage	Tunisia	Regional	Features films directed by those of African or Middle Eastern nationality.
Cinekambiya International Film Festival	2015	Banjul and Brikama	Gambia	Regional	Features films made in indigenous languages.
Dockanema	2006	Maputo	Mozambique	Special interest	Annual documentary film festival.
Durban International Film Festival	1979	Durban	South Africa	International	Largest film festival in Southern Africa. Most of the screenings are African premieres.
Egyptian Catholic Center for Cinema Festival	1952	Cairo	Egypt	National	
El Gouna Film Festival	2017	El Gouna	Egypt	International	
Encounters South African International Documentary Festival	1999	Cape Town	South Africa	International	Annual documentary film festival.
Festival International du Film Espoir	2022	Abidjan	Ivory Coast	International	Annual festival promoting African films
Festival International du Film Amateur de Kélibia (FIFAK)	1964	Kélibia	Tunisia	International	Annual festival for amateur filmmakers.
Île Courts	2007	Mauritius	Mauritius	International	Annual short film festival.
International Arab Film Festival	1976	Oran	Algeria	International	
International Festival of Cinema and Audiovisual of Burundi	2009	Bujumbura	Burundi	International	
Marrakech International Film Festival	2001	Marrakesh	Morocco	International	
Joburg Film Festival	2016	Johannesburg	South Africa	International	
Kigali Cine Junction	2023	Kigali	Rwanda	International	Non-competitive
Lights, Camera, Africa!	2011	Lagos	Nigeria	International	
Lola Kenya Children's Screen	2005	Nairobi	Kenya	International	East Africa children's course in filmmaking
Luxor African Film Festival	2012	Luxor	Egypt	International	
Out In Africa South African Gay and Lesbian Film Festival	1994	Cape Town and Johannesburg	South Africa	International	Gay and lesbian film festival.
Panafrican Film and Television Festival of Ouagadougou	1969	Ouagadougou	Burkina Faso	international	The largest African film festival.
Pearl International Film Festival	2011	Kampala	Uganda	International	
Port Said International Film Festival	2025	Port Said	Egypt	International	
Rencontres du Film Court Madagascar	2006	Antananarivo	Madagascar	Pan-African/regional	The only film festival in Madagascar.
Rwanda Film Festival	2005	Kigali	Rwanda	International	Last edition 2019
Sahara International Film Festival	2003	Sahrawi refugee camps	Sahrawi Republic; Algeria	International	The only film festival in the world held in a refugee camp.
Silwerskerm Film Festival	2010	Camps Bay	South Africa	National	The only Afrikaans film festival in the world.
South African Horrorfest	2005	Cape Town	South Africa	International	Festival for horror and genre films; the longest running and only event of its kind in South Africa and the African continent
Tri Continental Film Festival (TCFF)	2002/5	Cape Town	South Africa	International	The 3 Continents Film Festival was held in 2002. (Note: One source says September 2003, but that is probably incorrect.) The Tri Continental Film Festival was first held in 2005. Still going as of 2017.
Uganda Film Festival Awards	2013	Kampala	Uganda	National	
Zanzibar International Film Festival	1997	Zanzibar City	Tanzania	International	An annual film, music and arts festival.
Zimbabwe International Film Festival	1997	Harare	Zimbabwe	International	

== Asia ==
	Est.	Location	Country	Type	Notes
Abhimani Film Festival	2006	Colombo	Sri Lanka	International	Also known as Celluloid Rainbows, the Festival is the oldest LGBT+ Film Festival in the South Asian region.
Abu Dhabi Film Festival	2007	Abu Dhabi	United Arab Emirates	International	Annual film festival showcasing films from the Arab world alongside international works.
Ahmedabad International Film Festival (AIFF)	2009	Ahmedabad	India	International	An national and international film festival.
Alpavirama South Asian Short Film Festival (Alpavirama)	2011	Ahmedabad	India	South Asian	For short films from young filmmakers of southeast Asia.
Animation Nation	2004	Singapore	Singapore	Animation	An annual film festival showcasing international and local animation works.
Ankara Film Festival	1988	Ankara	Turkey	International	Annual film festival showcasing films from Turkey alongside international works.
ARY Film Awards	2014	Karachi	Pakistan	International	
Asia Pacific Film Festival	1954	Rotating	Regionwide	Regional	First held in Tokyo, rotated annually.
Asian Queer Film Festival	2007	Tokyo	Japan	East Asian	Annual Asian lesbian, gay, bisexual and transgender film
Bali International Film Festival	2007	Bali	Indonesia	International	An international film festival.
Bangalore Queer Film Festival	2008	Bangalore	India	International	Annual lesbian, gay, bisexual and transgender film festival.
Bangkok Gay and Lesbian Film Festival	2015	Bangkok	Thailand	International	Annual lesbian, gay, bisexual and transgender film festival. (Inactive since 2017)
Bangkok International Film Festival	2003	Bangkok	Thailand	International	(Inactive since 2008)
Beijing College Student Film Festival	1993	Beijing	China		
Beijing Independent Film Festival	2004	Beijing	China	International	Independent films and documentaries.
Beijing International Film Festival	2011	Beijing	China	International	
Beijing Queer Film Festival	2001	Beijing	China	International	China's first and longest-running annual LGBT film festival.
Bengaluru International Film Festival	2006	Bangalore	India	International	
Seven Sisters North East International Film Festival	2013	Guwahati	India	International	Held annually, focuses on promoting Northeast India cinema
Bring Your Own Film Festival	2004	Puri	India	Special interest	
Bucheon International Fantastic Film Festival	1997	Bucheon	South Korea	International	Held annually in July, focuses on horror, thriller, mystery, and fantasy films.
Busan International Film Festival (BIFF)	1996	Busan	South Korea	International	First film festival in Korea, focusing on new films and first-time directors.
Changchun Film Festival	1992	Changchun	China	International, regional	Held biennially.
Chennai International Film Festival	2003	Chennai	India	International	Held annually.
Children's International Film Festival	2014	Dubai	United Arab Emirates	International	Annual film festival for children, held in UAE
Cinéma Vérité	2006?	Tehran	Iran	International	Held annually, for documentary films
Cinemalaya Philippine Independent Film Festival	2005	Manila	Philippines	National	Held annually, it showcases independent films and shorts.
Cinemanila International Film Festival	1999	Manila	Philippines	International	Held annually.
Cinemela Film Festival	2006	New Delhi	India	International	Held annually.
Damascus International Film Festival	1979	Damascus	Syria	International	Held annually in November.
Development Film Festival	2008	Madurai	India	International	Films about the development of the poor and vulnerable communities.
Dhaka International Film Festival	1992	Dhaka	Bangladesh	International	A biennial film festival.
Dharamshala International Film Festival	2012	Dharamshala	India	International	An international film festival.
Didor International Film Festival	2004	Dushanbe	Tajikistan	International	
Dubai International Film Festival	2004	Dubai	United Arab Emirates	International	
Duhok International Film Festival	2011	Duhok	Iraq	International	Featuring films from Kurdish regions as well as world cinema.
Fajr International Film Festival	1982	Tehran	Iran	International	Held every February.
Filmsaaz	2008	Aligarh, Uttar Pradesh	India	International	International short film festival held since 2008.
FreedomFilmFest	2003	Kuala Lumpur, Penang, Johor Bahru, and Sarawak	Malaysia	International	Human rights film festival held annually.
Golden Horse Film Festival and Awards	1962	Taipei	Taiwan	Regional	The annual, month-long festival, featuring Chinese-language and Asian films.
Guangzhou International Documentary Film Festival	2003	Guangzhou	China	International	
Haifa International Film Festival	1983	Haifa	Israel	International	Held annually on Sukkot, it is Israel's first film festival.
Hanoi International Film Festival	2010	Hanoi	Vietnam	International	Every 2 years.
Hiroshima International Animation Festival	1985	Hiroshima	Japan	International	ASIFA
Hiroshima International Film Festival	2009/2014	Hiroshima	Japan	International	From 2009-2013, Damah Film Festival
Hong Kong International Film Festival	1977	Hong Kong	Hong Kong	International	
Hong Kong Lesbian & Gay Film Festival	1989	Hong Kong	Hong Kong	International	Asia's first and longest-running LGBT film festival.
Hyderabad Bengali Film Festival	2014	Hyderabad	India	Regional	Annual film festival featuring works from the Bengali film industry.
Hyderabad International Film Festival	2007	Hyderabad	India	International	
ifva: Incubator for Film and Visual media in Asia	1993	Hong Kong	Hong Kong	International	Formerly known as the Hong Kong Independent Short Film and Video Awards
Image Forum Festival	1987	Tokyo, Kyoto and Yokohama	Japan	International	Japan's largest art films festival.
Indonesian Film Festival	1955	Jakarta	Indonesia	National	Annual film festival devoted to Indonesian films.
International Film Festival of India	1952	Goa	India	International	First held in 1952, since 1975 it has been an annual event.
International Film Festival of Kerala	1996	Thiruvananthapuram	India	International, Regional	Held annually in November or December.
I F P	2011	Mumbai	India	International	Held annually in December.
Jaipur International Film Festival	2009	Jaipur	India	International	Held annually in January or February
Jakarta Film Week	2021	Jakarta	Indonesia	International	An international film festival.
Jakarta International Film Festival	1999	Jakarta	Indonesia	International	An international film festival.
Japanese Film Festival (Singapore)	1999	Singapore	Singapore	Japanese	Annual film festival devoted to Japanese films.
Jecheon Intl Music & Film Festival	2005	Jecheon	South Korea	International	A music-themed film festival.
Jeonju International Film Festival	2000	Jeonju	South Korea	International	Focuses on digital, independent, and art films.
Jerusalem Film Festival	1984	Jerusalem	Israel	International	Annual festival featuring films from all over the world.
Jogja-NETPAC Asian Film Festival	2006	Yogyakarta	Indonesia	Asian	Annual Asian film festival.
Kara Film Festival	1992	Karachi	Pakistan	International	
KASHISH Mumbai International Queer Film Festival	2010	Mumbai	India	International, Regional	Held annually in May; showcases Indian and international LGBTQ films.
Kolkata International Film Festival	1995	Kolkata	India	International	Annual festival featuring films from all over the world since 1995
KOM:PAS	2012	Prague	Iran	International	Annual festival, formerly Festival of Iranian Films in Prague and later ÍRÁN:CI, now open to independent films from Central Asia, the Middle East, Africa, and Latin America
Korea Queer Film Festival	2001	Seoul	Republic of Korea	International	Annual lesbian, gay, bisexual and transgender film festival.
Kuala Lumpur International Film Festival	2007	Kuala Lumpur	Malaysia	International	Successor to the Kuala Lumpur World Film Festival.
Lethal Lesbian	2008	Tel Aviv	Israel	International	Festival screening independent films by and about women who love women
Luang Prabang Film Festival	2010	Luang Prabang	Laos	International, Southeast Asian	Annual festival, which showcases films from Association of Southeast Asian Nations-member countries.
Lux Style Awards	2001	Karachi	Pakistan	National	Lux Style Awards
Macau International Movie Festival	2009	Macau	China	International	
Malaysia Film Festival	1980	Malaysia	Malaysia	National	Malaysia's equivalent to the Academy Awards.
Metro Manila Film Festival	1975	Manila	Philippines	National	Focuses on Filipino films.
Mumbai International Film Festival	1990	Mumbai	India	International	Focuses on documentary, short, and animation films.
Mumbai Women's International Film Festival	2013	Mumbai	India	International	Annual film festival featuring films made by women directors and technicians.
Nepal International Film Festival	2018	Kathmandu	Nepal	International	International Film Festival
Nigar Awards	1957	Karachi	Pakistan	International	
Osian's Cinefan Festival of Asian and Arab Cinema	1999	New Delhi	India	Regional	
Patna Film Festival	2006	Patna	India	International	International film festival.
Pride International Film Festival	2004	Manila	Philippines	International	Annual lesbian, gay, bisexual and transgender film festival.
Pune International Film Festival	2003	Pune	India	International	Annual festival with an International Competition and a Marathi Competition.
Pyongyang International Film Festival	1987	Pyongyang	North Korea	International	Biennial
Q! Film Festival	2002	Jakarta	Indonesia	International	One of Asia's largest annual LGBT film festival.
QCinema International Film Festival	2013	Quezon City	Philippines	National and international	Annual
Rainbow Reel Tokyo	1992	Tokyo	Japan	International	Japan's oldest LGBT+ film festival. 'Rainbow Reel Tokyo' is the new official name for the 'Tokyo International Lesbian & Gay Film Festival' (since 2016).
Shanghai International Film Festival	1993	Shanghai	China	International	Mainland China's largest film festival.
ShanghaiPRIDE Film Festival	2015	Shanghai	China	International	Annual lesbian, gay, bisexual and transgender film festival.
Shanghai Queer Film Festival	2017	Shanghai	China	Chinese (English subtitling)	Volunteer-run, not-for-profit LGBT+ film festival highlighting the films of Chinese filmmakers.
Singapore International Film Festival	1987	Singapore	Singapore	International	Singapore's longest running film festival, focusing on Asian works.
siffcy	2015	New Delhi	India	International	Held annually in December.
Syne International Film Festival	2001	Cochin	India	International	Held annually in May.
Taipei Film Festival	1998	Taipei	Taiwan	International	
Taiwan International Documentary Festival	1998	Taipei	Taiwan	International	Documentary film festival.
Taiwan International Queer Film Festival	2014	Taipei	Taiwan	International	Taiwan's first and only annual LGBT film festival.
Tel Aviv International Documentary Film Festival (Docaviv)	1998	Tel Aviv	Israel	International	The only film festival in Israel dedicated to documentary films, and the largest film festival in Tel Aviv.
Tel Aviv International LGBTQ+ Film Festival (TLVFest)	2006	Tel Aviv	Israel	International	The festival is focused on LGBTQ-themed film from around the world.
Tel Aviv International Student Film Festival	1986	Tel Aviv	Israel	International	Student film festival
Thai Short Film and Video Festival	1997	Bangkok	Thailand	Special interest	Featuring short films, primarily by Thai independent filmmakers.
Thrissur International Film Festival	2006	Thrissur	India	International	Second largest film festival in Kerala state.
Tigerland India Film Festival	2014	Bhopal	India	International	Annual wildlife and environmental film festival.
Tokyo Filmex	2000	Tokyo	Japan	International	Organized annually by Office Kitano.
Tokyo International Film Festival	1985	Tokyo	Japan	International	
ViBGYOR International Short and Documentary Film Festival	2006	Thrissur	India	Special interest	Short films and documentaries on issues and people's movements with an activist outlook.
Vietnam Film Festival	1970	different cities	Vietnam	National, Vietnamese	
Wathann Film Fest	2011	Yangon	Myanmar	National	First film festival in Myanmar, featuring mainly short films.
Women Make Waves	1993	Taipei	Taiwan	International	
World Film Festival of Bangkok	2003	Bangkok	Thailand	International	Organized by Nation Multimedia Group. (Inactive since 2017)
Yamagata International Documentary Film Festival	1989	Yamagata	Japan	Documentary	Biennial documentary film festival.

== Europe ==
Name	Est.	Location	Country	Type	Notes
Africa in Motion	2006	Edinburgh	Scotland	African cinema	Annual film festival featuring African cinema.
Ale Kino! International Young Audience Film Festival	1969	Poznań	Poland	International, children's film	Films addressed to children and young adults.
American Film Festival	2010	Wrocław	Poland	American cinema	Annual film festival devoted to American cinema.
Angers European First Film Festival	1989	Angers	France	European	Showcasing new European cinema.
Annecy International Animation Film Festival	1960	Annecy	France	International, animation	The first animation film festival in history.
Al Jazeera Balkans Documentary Film Festival	2018	Sarajevo	Bosnia and Herzegovina	International, documentary	
Anifilm	2010	Třeboň	Czech Republic	International, animation	Held in Třeboň, dedicated to animated films.
Animator	2008	Poznań	Poland	International, animation	Dedicated to animated films.
Antalya International Film Festival	1963	Antalya	Turkey	International	Held annually in autumn.
Arctic Film Festival	2019	Svalbard	Norway	International	Held annually in September.
Baku International Film Festival East-West	1991	Baku	Azerbaijan	International	
Baku International Tourism Film Festival	2013	Baku	Azerbaijan	International	
Bergen International Film Festival	2000	Bergen	Norway	International	Also called BIFF, the festival is held annually in September or October.
Berlin International Film Festival	1951	Berlin	Germany	International	Also called the "Berlinale", the festival is held annually in February.
British Urban Film Festival	2005	London	England	Independent film	Also called BUFF, the festival is held every year around September.
Brussels International Fantastic Film Festival	1983	Brussels	Belgium	Special interest	Annual venue for horror, thriller, and science fiction films.
Brussels International Independent Film Festival	1974	Brussels	Belgium	Special interest	
Cambridge Film Festival	1977	Cambridge	England	International	Held annually, currently in October.
Camerimage	1993	Toruń	Poland	International	Dedicated to the art of cinematography, held annually in November.
Caminhos do Cinema Português	1998	Coimbra	Portugal	Special Interest	Held annually in November, it has a special interest in Portuguese film.
Cannes Film Festival	1946	Cannes	France	International	One of the world's oldest, most influential, and prestigious festivals, it is held annually (usually at the end of May) at the Palais des Festivals et des Congrès.
Children KinoFest	2014	Kyiv	Ukraine	International	Held annually at the end of May, with short films and features from around the world.
CinEast	2008	Luxembourg	Luxembourg	International/Central and Eastern European films	Focuses on recent feature films, as well as documentaries, animated works, and short films.
CineFest Miskolc International Film Festival	2004	Miskolc	Hungary	International	Held annually in September, features international and native films as Hungarian premieres (short, documentary, feature)
Media Wave International Film Festival	1991	Győr	Hungary	International	Held annually during April–May features international and native films as Hungarian premieres (short, documentary, feature)
CinemAsia Film Festival	2003	Amsterdam	Netherlands	Asian film	Held annually in April, features European and Dutch premieres of Asian movies (feature, documentary, animated, shorts).
Colchester Film Festival	2012	Colchester	England	International	Held annually in October.
Cork Film Festival	1956	Cork	Ireland	International	Held annually in November, it includes short films, features, documentaries, live soundtrack events, and experimental filmmaking.
CPH:PIX	2009	Copenhagen	Denmark	International	Held from 27 September-10 October.
Croatian Minute Movie Cup	1993	Požega	Croatia	International	
Crossing Europe	2004	Linz	Austria	European films	Last week of April
Cyprus International Film Festival	2006	Nicosia	Cyprus	International	
Cyprus International Short Film Festival	2008	Nicosia	Cyprus	International, short film	
Diagonale	1998	Graz	Austria	International	Held annually in March.
Douro Film Harvest	2009	Douro	Portugal	International	A decentralized film festival.
Drama International Short Film Festival	1978	Drama	Greece	International, short film	Held annually in September
Dublin International Film Festival	2002	Dublin	Ireland	International	Succeeded Dublin Film Festival, held annually in February or March.
Edinburgh International Film Festival	1947	Edinburgh	Scotland	International	One of the longest continuously running film festivals in the world, taking place annually in August.
East London LGBTQ+ Film Festival	2023	London	England	International	Held annually in November.
Fantasporto	1982	Porto	Portugal	Genre	International fantasy, horror, action and science-fiction festival.
FEST	1971	Belgrade	Serbia	International	An international film festival held annually in February or March.
Festival del Cinema all'Aperto "Accordi @ DISACCORDI"	2000	Naples	Italy	Regional; International	Annual three-month outdoor film festival
Festival du Film Merveilleux	2010	Paris	France	International	
Festróia - Tróia International Film Festival	1985	Setúbal	Portugal	Special interest	Held annually in June, the competition section is open to films from countries that produce fewer than 30 films per year.
Five Flavours Film Festival	2007	Warsaw	Poland	Asian film	Dedicated to the cinema of Southeast and East Asia.
Flanders International Film Festival Ghent	1974	Ghent	Belgium	International	
Film Festival Cologne	1991	Cologne	Germany	International	Held annually in October, the Film and Television festival, formerly known as the Cologne Conference
Filmfest Hamburg	1992	Hamburg	Germany	International	
Flip Animation Festival	2004	Wolverhampton	England	Animation	Annual independent film festival held at the Cinema "Light House".
Free Zone Film Festival	2005	Belgrade	Serbia	International	An international human rights film festival held annually across three cities in Serbia.
FreeNetWorld International Film Fest	2008	Niš	Serbia	International	Held annually.
Fresh Film Festival	2004	Karlovy Vary	Czech Republic	International	Student film, feature, documentary, animation, experimental.
Fribourg International Film Festival (FIFF)	1980	Fribourg	Switzerland	International	Festival devoted to international cinema. Held annually in March. The FIFF is one of the five most important film festivals in Switzerland.
Galway African Film Festival	2008	Galway	Ireland	African cinema	Films by African directors, covering all genres.
Geneva International Film Festival	1995	Geneva	Switzerland	International	Festival devoted to cinema, television, and digital creation held annually in November.
Gdynia Film Festival	1974	Gdynia	Poland	Polish cinema	Annual film festival featuring Polish cinema.
Giffoni Film Festival	1971	Giffoni Valle Piana	Italy	International	One of the largest film festivals for children, held annually in July, with short films and features from around the world.
Gijón International Film Festival	1963	Gijón	Spain	International	
Glasgow Film Festival	2005	Glasgow	Scotland	International	Annual festival held in February and/or March.
Glowflare Short Film Festival	2024	Yorkshire	England	International	Annual festival held in March.
Glowflare Horror Film Festival	2024	Yorkshire	England	International	Annual festival held in September.
Golden Apricot - Yerevan International Film Festival	2004	Yerevan	Armenia	International	Annual festival featuring new works by Armenian directors and producers, and foreign cinematographers of Armenian descent.
Göteborg International Film Festival	1979	Gothenburg	Sweden	International	Held annually in January to February.
La Guarimba International Film Festival	2013	Amantea	Italy	International	The biggest short film festival in Italy. Held annually in August.
International Festival of Independent Cinema Off Camera	2008	Kraków	Poland	International	Film festival devoted to independent cinema.
International Film Awards Berlin	2012	Berlin	Germany	International	Held annually in August
International Film Festival Mannheim-Heidelberg	1952	Mannheim, Heidelberg	Germany	International	Held annually in November
International Film Festival Rotterdam	1972	Rotterdam	Netherlands	International	Held annually in January or February.
Thessaloniki International Film Festival	1960	Thessaloniki	Greece	International	Held annually in November, focusing in work of new and emerging filmmakers.
Istanbul International Film Festival	1982	Istanbul	Turkey	International	Held annually around the end of April.
Jewish Motifs International Film Festival	2004	Warsaw	Poland	International	Held annually in April or May. Jewish-themed films.
Jihlava International Documentary Film Festival	1997	Jihlava	Czech Republic	International, documentary	Largest event of its kind in Central and Eastern Europe. Held annually in October.
Karlovy Vary International Film Festival	1946	Karlovy Vary	Czech Republic	International	One of the oldest film festivals and oldest in Central Europe, Organised annually.
Kastav Film Festival	2009	Kastav	Croatia	International	
Kaunas International Film Festival	2007	Kaunas	Lithuania	International	Held annually in October.
Kraków Film Festival	1960	Kraków	Poland	International, short film	Short film festival of global importance. The oldest film event in Poland.
Kratkofil International short film festival	2007	Banja Luka	Bosnia and Herzegovina	International, short film	Short film festival.
Küstendorf	2008	Drvengrad	Serbia	International, short film	Held annually in January, featuring short films.
Lausanne Underground Film & Music Festival	2002	Lausanne	Switzerland	International	Underground movies, experimental music. Held annually in October.
Leeds International Film Festival	1986	Leeds	England	International	
Leiden International Film Festival	2006	Leiden	Netherlands	International	Films screened in cinemas but also in special locations like museums, churches, clubs, and gardens.
Lisbon Gay & Lesbian Film Festival	1996	Lisbon	Portugal	Special interest	Featuring international LGBT film and video.
Locarno International Film Festival	1946	Locarno	Switzerland	International	One of the oldest film festivals held annually in August.
London Asian Film Festival	1999	London	England	Asian film	Held annually at the BFI or BAFTA in the spring.
London Film Festival	1956	London	England	International	Held annually by the British Film Institute.
London Independent Film Festival	2004	London	England	International	Specialises in low-budget independent films
London International Documentary Festival	2007	London	England	International, documentary	Also known as LIDF. Held annually in March/April, with extra screenings all year round.
Manaki Brothers Film Festival	1979	Bitola	North Macedonia	International	Official competition for cinematographers. Held annually in September.
Manchester Film Festival	2015	Manchester	England	International	For British and International films.
Message to Man	1989	Saint Petersburg	Russia	International	International documentary, short, and animation film festival held in Russia.
Mobile Motion Film Festival	2015	Zurich	Switzerland	International	First will be held in 2015.
Molodist	1970	Kyiv	Ukraine	International	Competition devoted to student, first short and first full feature films from all over the world. Held annually in October.
Moscow International Film Festival	1935	Moscow	Russia	International	First held in 1935, from 1959 to 1995 it was held every second year in July (alternating with Karlovy Vary film festival), and since 1995 has been held annually.
Motovun Film Festival	1999	Motovun	Croatia	Special interest	Dedicated to independent film.
Mykonos Biennale	2013	Mykonos	Greece	International	Part of the Mykonos Biennale art festival, mainly shows shorts and art videos.
Nederlands Film Festival	1981	Utrecht	Netherlands	National	Both the home of Dutch cinema and the leading platform for the Netherlands' national film culture.
Neuchâtel International Fantastic Film Festival	2000	Neuchâtel	Switzerland	International	A Swiss festival for fantastic films, Asian cinema and future images. Held annually in July.
New Horizons International Film Festival	2001	Wrocław	Poland	International	Held annually in the end of July.
New Renaissance Film Festival	2015	London	England	International	Independent films, feature-length and short films.
Norwegian International Film Festival	1973	Haugesund	Norway	International	Held annually in August.
Norway Tamil Film Festival Awards	2010	Oslo	Norway	International	To honour both artistic and technical excellence of professionals in the Tamil film industry.
Odesa International Film Festival	2010	Odesa	Ukraine	International	festival held annually in July.
Odense International Film Festival	1975	Odense	Denmark	International, short film	Short film festival held annually in August. The oldest film festival in Denmark.
Oldenburg International Film Festival	1994	Oldenburg	Germany	International	Annual festival of independent film.
Pacific Meridian	2003	Vladivostok	Russia	Specific interest	Annual festival featuring films from Asian Pacific Countries.
Paris Lesbian and Feminist Film Festival	1989	Paris	France	International	Women-only festival featuring films by and about lesbians and feminism
Pluk de nacht	2003	Amsterdam	Netherlands	International	Open air film festival focusing on art house, short films, and media art. Held annually in August.
Pravo Ljudski Film Festival	2006	Sarajevo	Bosnia and Herzegovina	International	Human rights
Public Health Film Festival	2014	Oxford	England	Films on health	
Pula Film Festival	1953	Pula	Croatia	Regional	
Radiant Angel Film Festival	2007	Moscow	Russia	International	Held annually in November. International charity film festival.
Raindance Film Festival	1993	London	England	Special interest	A festival for independent films; also the founder of the British Independent Film Awards.
Reykjavík International Film Festival	2004	Reykjavík	Iceland	International	Held annually in September, featuring current independent and alternative cinema.
Rome Film Festival	2006	Rome	Italy	International	Held annually in October.
Rome Independent Cinema Festival	2018	Rome	Italy	International	Held annually in August.
Rome Independent Film Festival	2001	Rome	Italy	International	Held annually in November.
Romford Film Festival	2017	London	England	International	Held annually in May.
Romford Horror Film Festival	2020	London	England	International	Held annually in February.
Russian Film Week	2016	London, Cambridge, Edinburgh	United Kingdom	Special interest	A Contemporary Russian film and international films with a Russian connection
San Sebastián International Film Festival	1953	San Sebastián	Spain	International	An annual FIAPF "A" category festival.
Sarajevo Fashion Film Festival	2015	Sarajevo	Bosnia and Herzegovina	International	Showcases fashion films, advertising films, music videos, and short documentaries on the fashion industry.
Sarajevo Film Festival	1995	Sarajevo	Bosnia and Herzegovina	International	Held annually in August.
Sarajevo Youth Film Festival	2008	Sarajevo	Bosnia and Herzegovina	International	Held annually in July, showcases student and youth-made films.
SCHLINGEL International Film Festival	1996	Chemnitz	Germany	International	Held annually in Autumn, spotlighting movies for children and young audience.
SEMINCI	1956	Valladolid	Spain	International Indie	Held annually in October. Also known as Valladolid International Film Festival or Semana Internacional de Cine de Valladolid
Sheffield DocFest	1994	Sheffield	England	International documentary	Held annually in June.
ShortCutz Amsterdam	2013	Amsterdam	Netherlands	Short film	Held annually, featuring short-films.
Sitges Film Festival	1967	Sitges	Spain	Genre (fantasy)	Held annually in October.
Sofia International Film Festival	1997	Sofia	Bulgaria	International	Also known as Sofia Film Fest. Held annually in March. Competitive specialized festival for first and second feature films.
Solothurn Film Festival	1966	Solothurn	Switzerland	Swiss cinema	Held annually in January.
Stockholm International Film Festival	1990	Stockholm	Sweden	International	Held annually in November.
Strasbourg European Fantastic Film Festival	2005	Strasbourg	France	European	Held annually in September.
Subversive Film Festival	2008	Zagreb	Croatia	International	
Swansea Bay Film Festival	2006	Swansea	Wales	International	Held annually in May/June. Featuring international independent and experimental films.
Tallinn Black Nights Film Festival	1997	Tallinn	Estonia	International	Held annually in the end of November. Known also as PÖFF.
Taormina Film Fest	1955	Taormina	Italy	International	Held annually in June, featuring Italian, Mediterranean, and international cinema.
Three Continents Festival	1979	Nantes	France	Special interest	Annual festival devoted to the cinemas of Asia, Africa, and Latin America.
Tirana International Film Festival	2003	Tirana	Albania	International	Held annually in September.
Tofifest	2002	Toruń	Poland	International, independent film	
Transatlantyk Festival	2011	Łódź	Poland	International	Moved from Poznań to Łódź in 2016.
Transilvania International Film Festival	2001	Cluj-Napoca	Romania	International	Held annually in June.
Tuzla Film Festival	2012	Tuzla	Bosnia and Herzegovina	International	Featuring south Slavic cinematography. Held annually in September.
UK Film Festival	2011	London	England	International	Focused on the discovery of new filmmakers, but also welcomes established talent.
Venice Film Festival	1932	Venice	Italy	International	The world's oldest film festival, it is held annually in late August or early September on the Venetian island of Lido.
Vienna Independent Shorts	2004	Vienna	Austria	Short film	Held annually in May.
Viennale	1960	Vienna	Austria	International	Held annually in October.
Vilnius International Film Festival	1995	Vilnius	Lithuania	International	Held annually in March.
VIVA Film Festival	2015	Sarajevo	Bosnia and Herzegovina	International, documentary	Documentary film with a focus on ecological, religious, and touristic themes.
Warsaw International Film Festival	1985	Warsaw	Poland	International	An FIAPF category "A" film festival held annually in the Polish capital every October.
War on Screen	2013	Châlons-en-Champagne	France	International	Annual film festival on conflicts.
Watersprite Film Festival	2008	Cambridge	England	International	The world's largest student film festival
ZagrebDox	2005	Zagreb	Croatia	International, documentary	International documentary film festival.
Zagreb Film Festival	2003	Zagreb	Croatia	International	
Zagreb Jewish Film Festival	2007	Zagreb	Croatia	International	
Zurich Film Festival	2005	Zurich	Switzerland	International	Held annually in Zurich

== North America ==
Name	Est.	Location	State/Province	Type	Notes
$100 Film Festival	1992	Calgary	Alberta	International	Annual festival dedicated to screening short films on Super 8mm and 16mm film.
100 Words Film Festival	2014	Charlotte	North Carolina	International	Celebrating concise storytelling, each film must contain exactly 100 spoken words. Held annually in November.
168 Film Festival	2003	Los Angeles	California	International	International speed filmmaking competition and festival. Held annually in April.
Action On Film International Film Festival	2005	Pasadena	California	International	Held annually in July, featuring independent and studio films.
American Black Film Festival	1996	Miami	Florida	International	Held annually in various states, featuring African Americans throughout the film industry.
American Conservation Film Festival	2003	Shepherdstown	West Virginia	Regional	Annual festival with the mission statement of "conservation-focused films and programs that engage, inform, and inspire"
Ann Arbor Film Festival	1961	Ann Arbor	Michigan	International	Longest-running film festival showcasing experimental and independent film in North America. Held annually in late March.
Appalachian Film Festival	2003	Huntington	West Virginia	International	Annual film festival in late April. Feature-length narrative & documentary films and shorts.
Arab Film Festival	1996	Various	California	International	Largest festival of contemporary Arab films in North America. Held annually in October, with touring programs year-round.
Arlington International Film Festival	2010	Arlington	Massachusetts	International	Focuses on multicultural awareness and the artistic and educational value of films from all around the world. Held annually in October.
Ashland Independent Film Festival	2001	Ashland	Oregon	International	Presents international and domestic shorts and features. Held annually in April.
Asian World Film Festival	2015	Los Angeles	California	International	Held annually in October–November.
Atlanta Film Festival	1977	Atlanta	Georgia	International	Held annually in April, featuring independent films of every genre.
Atlantic Film Festival	1980	Halifax	Nova Scotia	International	Held annually in September, featuring films from around the world.
Athena Film Festival	2011	New York City	New York	International	Held annually in February, featuring films on and about women's leadership.
Austin Film Festival	1994	Austin	Texas	International	Showcasing screenwriters in North America. Held annually in October.
Austin Revolution Film Festival	2011	Austin	Texas	International	Held annually in February, featuring films with a Central Texas Premiere.
Bel Air Film Festival	2008	Los Angeles	California	International	An international festival held annually in November.
Berlin & Beyond Film Festival	1996	San Francisco	California	Special Interest	New films from Germany, Austria, Luxembourg, and Switzerland.
Big Bear Lake International Film Festival	2000	Big Bear Lake	California	International	Showcasing Independent filmmakers from around the world, and includes a screenwriting competition. Held each September.
Big Sky Documentary Film Festival	2003	Missoula	Montana	International/Non-Fiction	Featuring non-fiction films, held each February.
Beloit International Film Festival	2006	Beloit	Wisconsin	International	A 10-day annual festival in late February. Feature-length narrative & documentary films and short films.
Boston Film Festival	1984	Boston	Massachusetts	International	Annually showcasing feature films, documentaries, and shorts in September.
The Boston Jewish Film Festival	1989	Boston	Massachusetts	Jewish	A non-competitive annual festival that screens contemporary films on Jewish themes from around the world. Held in November.
Boston Palestine Film Festival	2007	Boston	Massachusetts	International	
Boston Science Fiction Film Festival	1976	Boston	Massachusetts	Special Interest	A 10-day annual festival held every February, showcasing feature and short science fiction films.
Boston Underground Film Festival	1998	Boston	Massachusetts	International	An annual festival that specializes in alternative film and video.
Boulder International Film Festival	2004	Boulder	Colorado	International	Held annually over the Presidents' Day weekend in February.
Buffalo Dreams Fantastic Film Festival	2013	Buffalo	New York	International	10-day festival held annually in November featuring independent genre films.
Buffalo International Film Festival	2004	Buffalo	New York	International	4-day festival held annually in the Fall (usually October) featuring mainstream and independent films.
Burbank International Film Festival	2009	Burbank	California	International	
Calgary International Film Festival	2000	Calgary	Alberta	International	Held annually for 10 days in late September or early October.
Calgary Underground Film Festival	2003	Calgary	Alberta	International	Held annually for 7 days in April.
Camden International Film Festival	2005	Camden	Maine	Documentary	
Canadian Film Festival	2004	Toronto	Ontario	Canadian	
Cape Cod International Film Festival	2014	Chatham	Massachusetts	International	Annual high-curation-standard global boutique festival, early-mid October.
Capital City Film Festival	2011	Lansing	Michigan	Regional/International	Held annually in April. Initially focused on films made in Michigan, now includes films from across the nation and the world.
Castle Rock Film Festival	2009	Castle Rock	Colorado	Rocky Mountain Regional states	Held annually in late September or early October.
Cedar Rapids Independent Film Festival	2001	Cedar Rapids	Iowa	Regional/international	Held annually the first full non-Easter weekend in April.
CFC Worldwide Short Film Festival	1994	Toronto	Ontario	International	
Chagrin Documentary Film Festival	2010	Chagrin Falls	Ohio	Documentary	Held annually in early October for 5 days.
Chicago International Children's Film Festival	1983	Chicago	Illinois	International	First competitive festival of films for children in the US. Held annually in late October for 10 days.
Chicago International Film Festival	1965	Chicago	Illinois	International	Longest running competitive film festival in the US.
Chicago International REEL Shorts Festival	2003	Chicago	Illinois	International	Annual short film festival.
Chicago Palestine Film Festival	2002	Chicago	Illinois	International	
Cincinnati Film Festival	2010	Cincinnati	Ohio	International	
Cine Las Americas International Film Festival	1997	Austin	Texas	International	Held annually in the spring, showcasing Latin American, Latino, and indigenous films.
Cinéfest Sudbury International Film Festival	1989	Sudbury	Ontario	International	
Cinéfranco	1997	Toronto	Ontario	Francophone	
Cinequest Film Festival	1990	San Jose	California	International	The 13-day festival focuses on narrative films and includes shorts and student film programs.
Cine Pobre Film Festival	2003	Baja California Sur	Mexico	International	Curating The Word's Best Self Funded Films.
City University Film Festival	2009	New York City	New York	Regional, special interest	Official festival of CUNY featuring films by student filmmakers.
Cleveland International Film Festival	1977	Cleveland	Ohio	International	
COLCOA	1997	Los Angeles	California	International	A week of French film premieres in Hollywood - in April.
Columbus International Film & Animation Festival	1952	Columbus	Ohio	International	North America's oldest film festival, held annually in April.
Coronado Island Film Festival	2016	Coronado	California	International	Annual four-day festival with a monthly year-round Classic Movie Series.
Crested Butte Film Festival	2011	Crested Butte	Colorado	International	Held annually in September and the ACT Now award.
Crossroads Film Festival	2000	Jackson	Mississippi	International	Annual three-day festival held around April
CWRU Film Society Science Fiction Marathon	1976	Cleveland	Ohio	Special Interest	A ~30 hour science fiction marathon held annually in January.
DALLAS International Film Festival	2006	Dallas	Texas	International	
Dances With Films	1998	Los Angeles	California	International	The festival of unknowns (i.e. no celebrities).
DaVinci International Film Festival	2017	Los Angeles	California	International	Held annually in September at The Grove at Farmers Market honoring the arts & sciences with Leo Awards.
DC Palestinian Film and Arts Festival	2011	Washington, D.C.	Washington, D.C.	International	
DC Shorts Film Festival	2003	Washington, D.C.	Washington, D.C.	International	The largest short film event on the East Coast of the US.
Denver Film Festival	1978	Denver	Colorado	International	Held annually in November.
Denver Underground Film Festival	1997	Denver	Colorado	International	Showcasing independent filmmakers and avant-garde cinema since 1997. Held in October.
Detroit Windsor International Film Festival	2008	Detroit	Michigan	International	Held annually in June; hosts the annual DWIFF Challenge.
Disposable Film Festival	2007	San Francisco	California	International	Held annually in January.
Downtown Los Angeles Film Festival	2008	Los Angeles	California	International	
DOXA Documentary Film Festival	1998	Vancouver	British Columbia	International	Documentary film festival held annually for ten days in May.
Ebertfest	1997	Champaign	Illinois	Special interest	Founded by the film critic .
Edmonton International Film Festival	1986	Edmonton	Alberta	International	
Environmental Film Festival in the Nation's Capital	1993	Washington, D.C.	Washington, D.C.	Special interest, international	The largest and longest running environmental film festival in the United States.
Etheria Film Night	2014	Los Angeles	California	International	Features fantasy, horror, science fiction, thriller, and action short films directed by women.
Fairy Tales Queer Film Festival	1999	Calgary	Alberta	LGBT	
Fantasia Festival	1996	Montreal	Quebec	Special interest	Devoted to fantasy, horror, martial arts, and science fiction genres.
Fantastic Fest	2005	Austin	Texas	International, genre	
Festival du Nouveau Cinéma	1971	Montreal	Quebec	International	An annual independent film festival featuring independent films from around the world.
Festival of Cinema NYC	2016	New York	New York	International	
Florida Film Festival	1992	Maitland	Florida	International	An annual international film festival.
Frameline Film Festival	1976	San Francisco	California	Special interest, international	The longest-running LGBT film festival in the world.
French Film Festival - Richmond, Virginia	1993	Richmond	Virginia	French	Held the last weekend of March, featuring world and American premieres of French-language features and shorts.
Full Frame Documentary Film Festival	1998	Durham	North Carolina	International	An annual international event dedicated to non-fiction cinema.
Garden State Film Festival	2003	Asbury Park	New Jersey	International	New Jersey's Premier Independent Film Festival, held each spring.
GenreBlast Film Festival	2016	Winchester	Virginia	International	Devoted to horror, fantasy, action, underground, and science fiction genres.
GI Film Festival	2005	Washington, D.C. / San Diego	D.C. / California	International	Held in May and September, with a focus on preserving the stories of American veterans.
Gotham Screen Film Festival & Screenplay Contest	2007	New York City	New York	International	Featuring new American and international cinema, with a competitive screenplay contest.
Green Bay Film Festival	2010	De Pere	Wisconsin	International	Featuring films by independent filmmakers in Wisconsin and around the world.
Green Mountain Film Festival	1997	Montpelier	Vermont	International	Featuring local, domestic and international films (features, documentaries, shorts, animation).
Guadalajara International Film Festival	1988	Guadalajara	Mexico	International	A week-long film festival held each March.
Guanajuato International Film Festival	1997	San Miguel de Allende and Guanajuato	Mexico	International	Held annually in July.
Gulf Coast Film and Video Festival	1999	Seabrook	Texas	International	Featuring new and emerging artists.
Hamptons International Film Festival	1993	East Hampton	New York	International	
Havana Film Festival New York (HFFNY)	2000	New York City	New York	International	Competitive film festival celebrating Latin American cinema with a special focus on Cuba and its film industry. Partner of International Festival of New Latin American Cinema in Havana.
Hawaii International Film Festival (HIFF)	1981	Honolulu	Hawaii	International	Held annually in the fall for two weeks, it shows features, documentaries, and shorts from Asia, the Pacific, and Hawai`i.
Heartland Film Festival	1991	Indianapolis	Indiana	International	Held annually, featuring independent films.
High Falls Film Festival	2001	Rochester	New York	International	Featuring films by women filmmakers.
Highway 61 Film Festival	2011	Pine City	Minnesota	National	Held annually in mid-October, featuring filmmakers in East Central Minnesota and other midwestern American cities.
Hollywood Film Festival	1997	Los Angeles	California	International	Annual film festival.
Horrible Imaginings Film Festival	2009	San Diego and Santa Ana	California	Genre	Annually in September.
Hot Docs Canadian International Documentary Festival	1993	Toronto	Ontario	International	North America's largest documentary film festival.
Image+Nation	1987	Montreal	Quebec	LGBT	
imagineNATIVE Film + Media Arts Festival	1998	Toronto	Ontario	Indigenous	
Independent Film Festival of Boston	2003	Boston	Massachusetts	International	Independent films. Also known as IFFBoston or IFFB. Held annually in April.
Indianapolis International Film Festival	2004	Indianapolis	Indiana	International	
Indian Film Festival of Los Angeles	2003	Los Angeles	California	International	
Inside Out Toronto Lesbian and Gay Film and Video Festival	1991	Toronto	Ontario	International	Featuring LGBT films, held over 11 days in May.
Israeli Film Festival of Philadelphia	1996	Philadelphia	Pennsylvania	International	Israeli films. Held annually in February–March.
Ivy Film Festival	2001	Providence	Rhode Island	Student	
Jacksonville Film Festival	2003	Jacksonville	Florida	International	Held annually for 4 days in mid-May.
Julien Dubuque International Film Festival	2012	Dubuque	Iowa	International	Held annually in April.
Junction North International Documentary Film Festival	2013	Sudbury	Ontario	Documentary	
KahBang Film Festival	2009	Bangor	Maine	International	Held annually in August, a four-day music, art, and film festival.
Kingston Canadian Film Festival	2001	Kingston	Ontario	Canadian	
L.A. Comedy Shorts Film Festival	2007	Los Angeles	California	International	Held annually in the spring. The largest comedy short film festival in the United States.
Little Rock Film Festival	2006	Little Rock	Arkansas	International	Featuring regional, national and international filmmakers. Held annually in early June.
London Lesbian Film Festival	1991	London	Ontario	LGBT	
Long Beach International Film Festival	2012	Long Beach	New York	International	Held annually in late September, featuring independent, studio films, and films on the beach.
Los Angeles Asian Pacific Film Festival	1983	Los Angeles	California	International	Showcase of Asian Pacific American and international cinema. Held annually in April–May.
Los Angeles Film Festival	1995	Los Angeles	California	International	Disestablished in 2018. Showcased independent, feature, documentary, and short films, as well as music videos.
Louisiana Film Prize	2012	Shreveport	Louisiana	International	A narrative short film contest.
Love Your Shorts Film Festival	2011	Sanford	Florida	International	Held around Valentine's Day. Features only short films under 30 minutes in length.
Macabre Faire Film Festival	2012	Long Island	New York	International	Held twice a year for independent films of the horror, sci-fi, and fantasy genres.
Maelstrom International Fantastic Film Festival	2009	Seattle	Washington	Special interest	Devoted to action, animation, fantasy, horror, and science fiction cinema.
Magnolia Independent Film Festival	1997	Starkville	Mississippi	International and regional	Held annually in February for one weekend, featuring short and experimental films.
Marda Loop Justice Film Festival	2006	Calgary	Alberta	International	Featuring films dealing with human rights, environmental, and social issues.
Marfa Film Festival	2008	Marfa	Texas	International	Annual film festival.
Margaret Mead Film Festival	1976	New York City	New York	International	The longest-running festival for international documentaries in the US.
Martha's Vineyard African American Film Festival	2002	Oak Bluffs	Massachusetts		
Martha's Vineyard International Film Festival	2006	Vineyard Haven	Massachusetts	International	Held annually in September, featuring world cinema features and short films.
Martha's Vineyard Film Festival	2001	Chilmark	Massachusetts	International	Held annually in March, featuring action/activism-inspiring films.
Maryland Film Festival	1999	Baltimore	Maryland	International	Held annually for 4 days each May.
Method Fest Independent Film Festival	1999	Beverly Hills	California	International	The Method Fest is the Actor's Film Festival, a festival of discovery, seeking breakout-acting performances of emerging stars and established actors in story-driven independent films.
Mexico City International Contemporary Film Festival	2004	Mexico City	Mexico City	International	Also known as FICCO, it is hosted by Cinemex.
Miami International Film Festival	1983	Miami	Florida	International	Held annually for 10 days in March.
Miami Short Film Festival	2002	Miami	Florida	International	Held annually for 10 days in mid November.
Midwest Ski Film Festival	2008	Milwaukee	Wisconsin	Regional	Takes place each October.
Mile High Horror Film Festival	2010	Denver	Colorado	International	Featuring independent horror, thriller, and sci-fi films from around the world. It takes place annually each October.
Mill Valley Film Festival	1978	Mill Valley	California	International	Takes place each October, hosted by California Film Institute.
Milwaukee Film Festival	2009	Milwaukee	Wisconsin	International	Takes place each September and October.
Milwaukee Short Film Festival	1999	Milwaukee	Wisconsin	Regional	Takes place each September.
Minneapolis St. Paul International Film Festival	1983	Minneapolis-St. Paul	Minnesota	International	Held annually in the spring.
Mods & Rockers Film Festival	1999	Los Angeles	California	Special interest	Featuring rock music culture films.
Montclair Film Festival	2012	Montclair	New Jersey	International	An annual, community-based film festival featuring international filmmakers.
Montreal Independent Film Festival	2020	Montreal	Quebec	International	For independent films
Montreal International Documentary Festival	1998	Montreal	Quebec	International	
Montreal World Film Festival	1977	Montreal	Quebec	International	Largest North American competitive festival. Held late August to Labor Day. Focuses on films from around the world.
Monument Valley Film Festival	2007	Kayenta	Arizona	International	Held annually in the summer, it is the only film festival on the Navajo Nation.
Moondance International Film Festival	2000	Boulder	Colorado	International	An independent annual film festival and awards competition that takes place in the fall.
Morelia International Film Festival	2003	Morelia	Mexico	International	9-day film festival held annually during the second week of October.
MTN Craft Film Festival	2023	Clarksburg	West Virginia	Regional	Annual 4-day film festival in early October. Feature-length narrative & documentary films and shorts.
Nantucket Film Festival	1996	Nantucket	Massachusetts	International	Held annually in June. Has both film and screenplay competitions.
Naperville Independent Film Festival	2008	Naperville	Illinois	International	Annual film festival featuring the work of independent filmmakers.
Nashville Film Festival	1969	Nashville	Tennessee	International	Founded in 1969 as the Sinking Creek Film Celebration. Features feature-length and short films from around the world.
National Film Festival for Talented Youth - NFFTY	2007	Seattle	Washington	International	Showcases work by international filmmakers age 24 and under.
Native American Film and Video Festival	1979	New York City	New York	Indigenous Cinema	Bi-annual film festival featuring indigenous works from throughout the Americas.
Nevada International Film Festival	2009	Las Vegas	Nevada	Independent	Annual film festival, featuring American and International cinema.
New England Festival of Ibero American Cinema	2010	Providence	Rhode Island	Latin American	Annual competitive film festival featuring Spanish, Portuguese, and Latin American films.
New Media Film Festival	2009	Los Angeles	California	International	Annual film festival that brings together the work of established and emerging New Media Content Creators and video artists around the world.
New Orleans Film Festival	1989	New Orleans	Louisiana	International	Annual film festival, featuring international feature films and short films.
Newport Beach Film Festival	1999	Newport Beach	California	International	Founded in 1999, featuring studio and independent films.
New York Asian Film Festival	2002	New York City	New York	Special interest	Features Asian cinema, especially horror, action, and martial arts genres.
New York Film Festival	1962	New York City	New York	International	One of North America's oldest film festivals.
New York International Children's Film Festival	1997	New York City	New York	International	Features short films and features from around the world.
New York Polish Film Festival	2005	New York City	New York	Polish cinema	Dedicated to the cinema of Poland.
Northeast Film Festival	2013	Teaneck	New Jersey	International	Competition in features, shorts, documentaries, and student films. Held annually in September.
Northwest Film Fest	1993	Thunder Bay	Ontario	International	
Northwest Filmmakers' Festival	1973	Portland	Oregon	Independent	Competition in features, shorts, and documentaries made by filmmakers in Oregon, Washington, Idaho, Alaska, and British Columbia. Held annually in November.
Oaxaca Film Fest	2010	Oaxaca	Mexico	International	Held annually in November.
Oceanside International Film Festival	2009	Oceanside, San Diego County	California	International	Held annually in August through 2020. Annually in February since 2021.
Orlando Film Festival	2006	Orlando	Florida	International	Held annually in October/November.
Ottawa International Animation Festival	1976	Ottawa	Ontario	International	Held annually in September
Ottawa Canadian Film Festival	2015	Ottawa	Ontario	Canadian	Held annually in November
Out on Film	1987	Atlanta	Georgia	International	Held annually in September/October
Palm Springs International Film Festival	1989	Palm Springs	California	International	
Pan African Film Festival	1992	Los Angeles	California		The largest black film festival in the United States.
Philadelphia Asian American Film Festival	2008	Philadelphia	Pennsylvania	Special interest	
Philadelphia Film Festival	1991	Philadelphia	Pennsylvania	International	
Philadelphia Jewish Film Festival	1981	Philadelphia	Pennsylvania	International	The second-oldest Jewish-specific film festival in the United States
Philadelphia QFest	1995	Philadelphia	Pennsylvania	International	Originally the Philadelphia International Gay and Lesbian Film Festival.
Québec City Film Festival (QCFF)	2011	Quebec City	Quebec	International	Held annually in September, screens short and featured films.
Queer City Cinema	1996	Regina	Saskatchewan	LGBT	
Queer North Film Festival	2016	Sudbury	Ontario	LGBT	
Rainbow Visions Film Festival	2015	Edmonton	Alberta	LGBT	
Red Rock Film Festival	2004	Zion Canyon, St. George, Springdale, Ivins	Utah	International	Held annually in November.
Reel Rock Film Tour	2006	Boulder	Colorado	International	Held annually, climbing and adventure films.
Reel Shorts Film Festival	2007	Grande Prairie	Alberta	International	Festival of short films held annually for 5 days in early May.
Reel Pride	1987	Winnipeg	Manitoba	LGBT	
Reelout Queer Film Festival	1999	Kingston	Ontario	LGBT	
ReelWorld Film Festival	2001	Toronto	Ontario	International	Screens films and music videos by filmmakers from racially diverse communities.
Renegade Film Festival	2017	Atlanta	Georgia	International	Showcases films made by filmmakers from diverse backgrounds, including women, people of color, members of the LGBTQ+ community, and those with disabilities.
Rhode Island International Film Festival	1997	Providence	Rhode Island	International	Held annually for 6 days during the second week of August
RiverRun International Film Festival	1998	Winston-Salem	North Carolina	International	Held annually each Spring.
Rocky Mountain Women's Film Festival	1987	Colorado Springs	Colorado	International	Held annually in early November, showcasing films made by women.
Rooftop Films	1997	New York City	New York	International	A summer-long outdoor festival that screens new independent films on rooftops and other outdoor spots.
Sacramento Film and Music Festival	2000	Sacramento	California	International	Juried, all genre, includes student section, 10 days, late July.
Sacramento French Film Festival	2002	Sacramento	California	International	Second largest French film festival on the west coast. Summer, Fall, and Winter events.
San Antonio Film Festival	1994	San Antonio	Texas	International	Held annually in the month of June. Awards
San Diego Asian Film Festival	2000	San Diego	California	International	Held annually in November, with a spring showcase in April.
San Diego Black Film Festival	2002	San Diego	California	International	
San Diego International Film Festival	2001	San Diego, La Jolla	California	International	Held in October, a five-day independent film festival.
San Diego Latino Film Festival	1993	San Diego	California	International	Held annually in March.
San Francisco Frozen Film Festival	2006	San Francisco	California	Special interest, independent	
Sanford International Film Festival	2014	Sanford	Maine	Independent, horror, international	Held in October. Dedicated to independent films, with a night dedicated to horror.
San Francisco Green Film Festival	2011	San Francisco	California	Special interest, international	Dedicated to environmental films.
San Francisco International Asian American Film Festival	1982	San Francisco	California	Special interest, international	Dedicated to Asian and Asian American films.
San Francisco International Film Festival	1957	San Francisco	California	International	
San Francisco Jewish Film Festival	1980	San Francisco	California	Special interest, international	
Santa Barbara International Film Festival	1985	Santa Barbara	California	International	
Santa Fe Film Festival	1999	Santa Fe	New Mexico	International	Highlighting New Mexican film, new American and foreign films.
Sarasota Film Festival	1999	Sarasota	Florida	International	
Science Fiction Fantasy Short Film Festival	2006	Seattle	Washington	Special interest	Devoted to action, animation, fantasy, and science fiction cinema.
Seattle International Film Festival	1976	Seattle	Washington	International	Largest film festival in the United States, held annually from May to June.
Seattle Polish Film Festival	1992	Seattle	Washington	Polish cinema	
Sedona Film Festival	1994	Sedona	Arizona	International	
Slamdance Film Festival	1995	Park City	Utah	International	Focused on emerging filmmakers and low-budget independent films.
Sidewalk Moving Picture Festival	1999	Birmingham	Alabama	International	Held annually the last weekend in August.
Sonoma Valley Film Festival	1996	Sonoma	California	International	
South by Southwest	1987	Austin	Texas	Special interest	A set of film, interactive, and music festivals.
Southern Utah International Documentary Film Festival (DOCUTAH)	2009	St. George	Utah	International	Held annually for one week in September.
SouthSide Film Festival	2008	Bethlehem	Pennsylvania	Regional	Held annually in June.
St. John's International Women's Film Festival	1989	St. John's	Newfoundland and Labrador	International	Screens films made by women, to promote gender parity in filmmaking
Sundar Prize Film Festival	2024	Surrey	British Columbia	International	Recognize and showcase films that tackle critical social causes and issues, inspiring action and raising awareness
Nickel Independent Film Festival	2001	St. John's	Newfoundland and Labrador	International	Conceived in 2001 to allow local filmmakers to exhibit their film and video work.
Smith Sound Film Festival	2017	George's Brook-Milton	Newfoundland and Labrador	International	Originated in 2017 after wanting to show older works done on celluloid for the public to see, with the building of a screen and projector commencing later.
Sundance Film Festival	1978	Park City, Salt Lake City, Ogden, Sundance	Utah	International	Held annually in January, Sundance is the largest independent film festival in the United States.
Tallgrass Film Festival	2003	Wichita	Kansas	International	This four-day festival, held in October, screens independent short and feature films.
Telluride Film Festival	1974	Telluride	Colorado	International	Held annually over Labor Day Weekend.
Telluride Mountainfilm	1979	Telluride	Colorado	Independent	The oldest film festival celebrating the genre of mountain film in the US.
Three Rivers Film Festival	1982	Pittsburgh	Pennsylvania	International	Emphasizing independent film.
Toronto After Dark Film Festival	2006	Toronto	Ontario	Special interest	Annual festival of horror, sci-fi, action, and cult cinema.
Toronto International Film Festival	1976	Toronto	Ontario	International	Held annually in September.
Toronto Reel Asian International Film Festival	1997	Toronto	Ontario	Special Interest	Featuring Asian films.
Toronto Tamil Film Festival	2020	Toronto	Ontario	International	International Tamil Film Festival held annually in September.
Traverse City Film Festival	2005	Traverse City	Michigan	International	Founded by documentary film maker Michael Moore. Held annually in late July - early August
Tribeca Film Festival	2002	New York City	New York	International	Founded by Jane Rosenthal and Robert De Niro.
True/False Film Festival	2004	Columbia	Missouri	Documentary	Documentary film festival.
St. Louis International Film Festival	1992	St. Louis	Missouri	International	Annual event held in November with film events to advance film as an art form.
St. Louis Filmmakers Showcase	2000	St. Louis	Missouri	Special Interest	Festival held annually in July, with films written, directed, edited, or produced by St. Louis natives or those with strong local ties.
Vancouver Asian Film Festival	1995	Vancouver	British Columbia	International	Asian film festival. Held annually for 4–5 days in November.
Vancouver International Film Festival	1982	Vancouver	British Columbia	International	Held annually for two weeks in late September and early October.
Vancouver Queer Film Festival	1988	Vancouver	British Columbia	International	LGBT film festival. Held annually for eleven days in late August.
Vietnamese International Film Festival	2003	Los Angeles	California	Vietnamese	Biennial film festival for Vietnamese filmmakers.
Virginia Film Festival	1987	Charlottesville	Virginia	International	Hosted by the University of Virginia.
Vox Popular Media Arts Festival	2005	Thunder Bay	Ontario	International	
Waterloo Festival for Animated Cinema	2001	Waterloo	Ontario	International	Screens feature animation. Held annually in November.
Whistler Film Festival	2001	Whistler	British Columbia	International	
Windsor International Film Festival	2005	Windsor	Ontario	International	Held annually for eleven days in late October and early November.
Wisconsin Film Festival	1999	Madison	Wisconsin	International	Screens independent and international documentary, narrative, experimental, student, and animated films.
Woodstock Film Festival	1999	Woodstock	New York	International	Features independent films.
World Music & Independent Film Festival	2009	Washington, D.C.	Washington, D.C.	International	Screens independent and international music videos and independent films
WorldFest-Houston International Film Festival	1968	Houston	Texas	International	
Yorkton Film Festival	1950	Yorkton	Saskatchewan	Independent	Features Canadian films and filmmakers.
The YoungCuts Film Festival	2005	Montreal	Quebec	International	Focuses on young filmmakers.
Young People's Film Festival	1976	Portland	Oregon	Youth, regional	Features works of filmmakers grades K-12 living in Alaska, Idaho, Montana, Oregon, Utah, and Washington.

== Oceania ==
Name	Est.	Location	Country	Type	Notes
Adelaide Film Festival	2002	Adelaide	Australia	International	A biennial, non-competitive film festival held over two weeks in late February.
Brisbane International Film Festival	1992	Brisbane	Australia	International	Focuses on films from the Pacific Rim.
Byron Bay Film Festival	2006	Byron Bay	Australia	International	
Canberra International Film Festival	1996	Canberra	Australia	International	Held annually in October.
Doc Edge	2005	Auckland, Wellington	New Zealand	International	Held annually from April to June, featuring documentary films from New Zealand and around the world.
Dungog Film Festival	2007	Dungog	Australia	Australian	Features new and classic Australian films.
CinefestOZ	2008	South West of Western Australia	Australia	Australian & French	Annually in August for 5 days.
Heathcote Film Festival	2010	Heathcote, Victoria	Australia	Australian & International	Annual short film festival
Indian Film Festival of Melbourne	2010	Melbourne	Australia	Indian and sub-continent	Held annually in August, featuring Indian cinema.
Mardi Gras Film Festival	1978	Sydney	Australia	International	Held annually in February–March
Melbourne International Film Festival	1951	National	Australia	International	Held annually in July or August.
New Zealand International Film Festivals	1970	Major cities nationwide	New Zealand	International	Held in Auckland, Wellington, Dunedin, and Christchurch, the traveling festival offers a smaller program in 10 other cities.
A Night of Horror International Film Festival	2006	Sydney	Australia	International	Featuring horror films.
Revelation Perth International Film Festival	1997	Perth	Australia	International	Annually in July; features independent feature films, documentaries, short films, and experimental works.
Show Me Shorts	2006	National	New Zealand	International	Annual short film festival.
Sydney Film Festival	1954	Sydney	Australia	International	Held annually for two weeks in June.
Tropfest	1993	Sydney	Australia	International	Annual short film festival.

== South America and the Caribbean ==
Name	Est.	Location	Country	Type	Notes
Anima Mundi	1992	Rio de Janeiro, São Paulo	Brazil	Regional, special interest	Competitive Brazilian video and film festival devoted exclusively to animation.
Buenos Aires International Festival of Independent Cinema	1999	Buenos Aires	Argentina	International	Held annually in April.
Buenos Aires Rojo Sangre	2000	Buenos Aires	Argentina	International	Devoted to fantasy, horror, bizarre, and science fiction genres.
CayFilm Cayman Islands International Film Festival	2013	George Town	Cayman Islands	International	
Cartagena Film Festival	1960	Cartagena	Colombia	Regional	Showcases Ibero-American feature films, shorts, and videos, as well as a national television competition.
Córdoba International Animation Festival - ANIMA	2001	Córdoba	Argentina	International, special interest	It is held biennially, on odd years, during September.
Fantaspoa	2005	Porto Alegre	Brazil	International, special interest	Focused on genre cinema, including fantasy, science fiction and horror.
Festival de Cine de Bogotá	1984	Bogotá	Colombia	International	Held annually in October.
FENAVID International Film Festival	2001	Santa Cruz de la Sierra	Bolivia	Latin American	Held annually in October. Includes the "Santa Cruz 100X100" short film production challenge
Gramado Brazilian and Latin American Film Festival	1973	Gramado	Brazil	Latin American	Held annually in August. Its awards are named the Kikitos.
Havana Film Festival	1979	Havana	Cuba	Regional	Held annually, with a principal focus on Latin American film.
Lusca Fantastic Film Fest	2007	San Juan	Puerto Rico	International	Held annually in October, with parallel events ranging from a fashion show to a zombie walk.
Mar del Plata Film Festival	1954	Mar del Plata	Argentina	International	Held annually in November, with a principal focus on independent and Latin American film.
Recife Cinema Festival	1997	Recife	Brazil	Brazilian	Competitive Brazilian film and audiovisual. Its awards are named Calunga. Held annually in April/May.
Rio de Janeiro International Film Festival	1998	Rio de Janeiro	Brazil	International	Held annually in October.
Santiago International Film Festival	2005	Santiago	Chile	International	There are two main competitions at SANFIC: the International Competition, and a Chilean Cinema Competition, each featuring nine shortlisted films. Held annually in October.
São Paulo International Film Festival	1976	São Paulo	Brazil	International	
Trinidad and Tobago Film Festival	2006	Trinidad and Tobago	Trinidad and Tobago	International	Held annually in the second half of September, featuring films from the Caribbean and world cinema.
Uruguay International Film Festival	1982	Montevideo	Uruguay	International	International film exhibition and competition, held annually
Valdivia International Film Festival	1993	Valdivia	Chile	International	International film exhibition and competition, held annually in September/October
Viña del Mar International Film Festival	1962	Viña del Mar	Chile	Latin American	Held annually in the second half of October, featuring films and documentary films from Latin America.

== Traveling and online festivals ==
Name	Est.	Type	Details
Sacramento French Film Festival	2002	International	A VIRTUAL CINEMA hosts all the Festival's special screenings and film events
48 Hour Film Project	2001	Special interest	Filmmakers are given 48 hours to create a film from assigned film elements.
Campus MovieFest	2001	Special interest	The world's largest student film festival, held annually at over 30 universities.
CON-CAN Movie Festival	2005	International (awards ceremony held in Tokyo, Japan	An audience-interactive online international short movie festival.
Dawn Breakers International Film Festival	2007	International	Features Baha'i-inspired films.
Filminute	2006	International	Features one-minute films from around the world.
International Random Film Festival	2009	International	Celebrates randomness in cinema. Films, sites, and awards are selected randomly.
Korkut Ata Film Festival of the Turkic World	2021	International	Annual film festival held in TURKSOY member states.
Spike and Mike's Festival of Animation	1977	Special interest	Animated shorts, tours over 50 cities in the US and Canada annually.

== See also ==
- List of film awards
- List of film festivals in South America
- List of film festivals in Europe
- List of film festivals in North and Central America
- List of film festivals in Oceania
- List of fantastic and horror film festivals
- List of documentary film festivals
- List of short film festivals
- List of women's film festivals
- Lists of films
