= Ronnie Cramer =

American film director (1957–2021)

- Born: Richard Ron Cramer; May 5, 1957; Bismarck, North Dakota, U.S.
- Died: June 29, 2021 (aged 64); Denver, Colorado, U.S.
- Occupations: Film producer, film director, screenwriter, artist, composer

Richard Ron Cramer (May 5, 1957 – June 29, 2021) was an American film producer, film director, screenwriter, artist and composer.

Born in Bismarck, North Dakota, Cramer lived and work in Denver, Colorado. During the 1980s, he produced watercolor paintings, video installations, and played guitar in several rock bands, most notably Alarming Trends, the subject and title of his first film (1987). Cramer's musical compositions included an award-winning score for the Fritz Lang sci-fi classic Metropolis (1927 film). As a director, Cramer gained national attention with his film Even Hitler Had a Girlfriend, a 1991 black comedy which was named "Best Drive-In Movie of the Year" by cult critic Joe Bob Briggs.

Cramer's first documentary film was Highway Amazon (2001), which told the story of Christine Fetzer, a female body builder who travels the country wrestling men in hotel rooms. The film was named Best Documentary at the Humboldt Film Festival and won other similar awards. Cramer's multimedia piece Pillow Girl combined traditional film techniques with pulp imagery and experimental music. It was screened at over 150 film festivals worldwide and was named "Best Experimental Work" at several events, including the Miami Short Film Festival, the Route 66 Film Festival, and the Big Muddy Film Festival at Southern Illinois University. Cramer's other work includes the experimental films Cantata in C Major, Mugs, Sixty in 60, September Sketch Book, and Icons.

Cramer died in Denver on June 29, 2021. He was 64.

== Filmography ==
- The Chair (2020)
- Icons (2018)
- September Sketch Book (2014)
- Living Canvas (2012)
- Sixty in 60 (2011)
- Mugs (2008)
- Cantata in C Major (2007)
- Pillow Girl (2004)
- 30 Miles (2003)
- Highway Amazon (2001)
- The Hitler Tapes (1994)
- Even Hitler Had a Girlfriend (1991)
- Back Street Jane (1989)
- Alarming Trends (1987)

== Awards ==
The Chair

- Best Animation, Indie Short Fest (2021)
- Best Animation, Kateye International Film Festival (2021)
- Best Animation Film, River Atreyee International Film Festival (2021)
- Best Animated Film, Silk Road Film Awards (2021)
- Best Animated Film, Cineville Calcutta Global Cinefest (2021)
- Best Experimental Animation, Great Asian World Cinema (2021)
- Best Animation, Falcon International Film Festival (2020)
- Best Animation, White Deer Film Festival (2020)
- Platinum Award for Animation, Mindfield Albuquerque (2020)
- Best Animated Film, Prague International Monthly Film Festival (2020)
- Best Animated Film, Rosebud International Film Festival (2020)
- Best Animated Film, Druk International Film Festival (2020)
- Best Animation, Varese International Film Festival (2020)
- Best Animated Film, Panjim International Film Festival (2020)
- Outstanding Animated Film, Holy Grail International Film Festival (2020)
- Best Animated Film, Aasha International Film Festival (2020)
- Best Animated Film, Buzz Vicious Film Festival (2020)
- Winner for Animation, La Dolce Vita Cine Roma (2020)
- Gold Award for Animated Film, Virgin Spring Cinefest (2020)
- Best New Media, Chico Independent Film Festival (2020)
- Best International Animated Short, Port Blair International Film Festival (2020)
- Best Animated Short, Global Film Festival Awards (2020)
- Best Animated Short, Top Indie Film Awards (2020)
- Best Animation, Madrid Kame Film Festival (2020)
- Best Animation, CEBU International Film Festival (2020)
- Best Animated Film, Teknochat Film Festival (2020)
- Best Animated Film, Art Independent International Film Festival (2020)
- Best Animated Short Film, International Film Festival of Andaman and Nicobar (2020)
- Best Indie Animation, Best Indie Film Awards (2020)

Icons

- Best Short Film, Logcinema Art Films (2018)
- Best Animated Short, Independent Shorts Awards (2018)
- Best Animated Film, Feodosiya International Film Festival (2018)
- Best Animated Short Film, South Film and Arts Academy Festival (2018)
- Best Animation, Motion Pictures International Film Festival (2018)
- Best Animated Short, Fayetteville Film Fest (2018)
- Best Animated Short, Global Film Festival Awards (2018)
- Best Animated Film, Shahu International Short Film Festival (2019)
- Best Animated Film, Mahul Woods International Film Festival (2019)
- Best Animated Film, ReelHeART International Film and Screenplay Festival (2019)

September Sketch Book

- Best Animated Film, Colony Short Film Festival (2016)
- Best Animation, North Wales Film Festival (2016)
- Best Animation, Colorado Film Awards (2016)
- Best Short Animation, Wolves Film Awards Lithuania (2016)
- Best Animation, ReelheART International Film Festival (2016)
- Gold Award, International Movie Awards (2014)
- Gold Award for Short Film, International Film & Photography Festival (2014)
- Orson Welles Award for Animation, California Film Awards (2014)
- Gold Award for Experimental Film, Oregon Film Awards (2015)
- Award of Excellence, Noida International Film Festival (2015)

Living Canvas

- Best Experimental Film, Great Lakes International Film Festival (2013)

Sixty in 60

- Gold Award for Documentary, California Film Awards (2012)
- Best Mockumentary, Mountain Film Awards (2012)
- Silver Reel Award for Documentary, Nevada Film Festival (2011)
- First Place for Experimental Feature, The Indie Gathering (2011)
- Gold Medal for Excellence, Park City Film Music Festival (2011)
- Best Production Design for an Experimental Film, Los Angeles International Film Festival (2011)
- Best Editing for an Experimental Film, Los Angeles International Film Festival (2011)
- Merit Award for Experimental Film, Los Angeles Cinema Festival of Hollywood (2011)

Mugs

- Best Experimental Film, Da Vinci Film Festival (2012)
- Northern Lights Emerging Talent Award, Alaska International Film Festival (2011)
- Golden Reel Award, Nevada Film Festival (2010)
- Experimental Film Honors, Best Editing, Best Visual Effects, Los Angeles Reel Film Festival (2010)
- John Muir Award for Animation, Yosemite Film Festival (2010)
- Experimental Gold Short Award, JamFest (2010)
- Platinum Award, American Pixel Academy (2010)
- Best Digital Film, San Francisco Frozen Film Festival (2009)
- Gold Kahuna Award, Honolulu International Film Festival (2009)
- Best Independent Experimental Work, Carolina Film and Video Festival (2008)
- Final Cut Award, Lake Havasu International Film Festival (2008)

Cantata in C Major

- Best Art/Experimental Film, Blue Ridge Film and Music Festival (2012)
- Best Historic Documentary, American International Film Festival (2011)
- Audience Award for Music/Comedy, Film Festival of Hendricks County (2011)
- Golden Reel Award, Nevada Film Festival (2010)
- Best Experimental Film, Route 66 Film Festival (2009)
- Silver Palm Award, Mexico International Film Festival (2009)
- Aloha Accolade Award, Honolulu International Film Festival (2009)
- James W. Johnson Award, Flatland Film Festival (2008)
- Juror's Award, River's Edge Film Festival (2008)

Pillow Girl

- Best Experimental Film, Route 66 Film Festival (2011)
- James W. Johnson Award, Flatland Film Festival (2007)
- First Place for Animation, Iowa City International Film Festival (2007)
- Audience Award Winner for Best Animation, Buffalo Niagara Film Festival (2007)
- Best Experimental Work, Big Muddy Film Festival (2007)
- Best Experimental Animation, Trail Dance Film Festival (2007)
- Special Jury Award, Portland International Short Short Film Festival (2006)
- Award Recipient for Experimental Film, Indie Gathering (2006)
- Best Experimental Film, Golden Star Shorts Fest (2006)
- Best Animated Short, Denver Underground Film Festival (2004)
- Best Experimental Film, Miami Short Film Festival (2004)
- Best Experimental Film, Coney Island Film Festival (2004)

30 Miles

- Best Short Documentary, Delta International Film and Video Festival (2013)
- Concept Award, Filmstock UK (2004)

Highway Amazon

- Best Short Documentary, Hollywood Reel Independent Film Festival (2012)
- Silver Sierra Award, Yosemite International Film Festival (2011)
- Aloha Accolade Award, Honolulu Film Awards (2011)
- Best Documentary, Miami Short Film Festival (2004)
- Best Documentary—Experimental Genre, New York International Independent Film Festival (2002)
