= Fetzer =

Fetzer may refer to:

- Fetzer (surname)
- Fetzer Field, sports field in North Carolina, United States
- Fetzer Institute, organization based in Michigan, United States
