= CCIFF =

CCIFF may refer to:

- Canada China International Film Festival
- Cape Cod International Film Festival
