= Jozef K. Richards =

American actor

- Born: July 9, 1989 (age 37); Milwaukee, Wisconsin, US
- Occupations: Film director, screenwriter, producer, actor, children's author, illustrator
- Years active: 2002–present

Jozef K. Richards (born July 9, 1989) is an American film director, screenwriter, producer, actor, children's author, and illustrator. He founded Kintou Media Company, which controls numerous other entertainment-based companies, including King's Tower Productions, and has distributed media through YouTube, Amazon, Barnes & Noble, and other international retailers.

== Career ==
=== King's Tower Productions ===
Jozef K. Richards is the founder and owner of King's Tower Productions and the writer and director of the 2011 film, The Amateur Monster Movie; the 2013 film, The Wayward Sun; and the 2014 short film, "Un Jardín Adentro de La Violencia".

From 2015 to 2017, Richards produced and starred in the satirical web series, "Holy Shit", which took aim at religious dogma, its lack of credibility, and pokes fun at the lesser-known absurdities of The Bible and similar religious texts, including many of those taken literally by some sects of the Christian faith. The show often features skits with atheist scholars and celebrity guests, which have included comedian Paul Provenza, theologian Robert M. Price, historian Richard Carrier, actress Heather Henderson, author David Fitzgerald, and American rapper and Wu-Tang Clan affiliate Killah Priest.

In 2016, the teaser trailer for Richards' third feature film, Batman & Jesus, was unveiled and used as the lead-in video by members of the Wu-Tang Clan (GZA, Method Man, Raekwon, Cappadonna, Killah Priest, and DJ Mathematics) during their first ever performance at the Lincoln Memorial in Washington, D.C. where they appeared as the headlining act for Reason Rally, one of the world's largest secular and religious skeptic gatherings. Richards' Batman & Jesus is an atheist-leaning documentary on the historicity of a Jesus of Nazareth that stars Provenza and features interviews with many who Richards worked with previously on "Holy Shit", including Price, Carrier, Fitzgerald, and Killah Priest, as well as activist and podcaster Aron Ra. The film premiered at Milwaukee's Pabst Theater on September 30, 2017, following Mythinformation Conference IV which featured a live debate on "The Future of Islam in the Age of Trump" between Asra Nomani and Faisal Saeed Al-Mutar, who appears as an interviewee in Richards' film as well.

Beyond religious examination, Richards has also released several broader projects and series within the comedy genre, including the web-series "Friday Night Weekly" that ran for two seasons, traveling to Colombia, Egypt, and the UAE in that time. Richards starred as himself in "Friday Night Weekly" and was joined by co-hosts Matt Henry, a Milwaukee area comedian, and future WYMS Radio Milwaukee deejay Makenzie Boettcher. Satirist Reuben Glaser was featured as the special reporter, and Aaron Fronk, Vince DeGaetano, and Cooper Johnson of FND Films guest starred in one of the series' most viewed episodes, "FND for Vendetta". Richards also worked with fellow Wisconsin filmmaker Mark Borchardt of American Movie on his first film, The Amateur Monster Movie, which premiered at the Oriental Theatre on January 1, 2011, and was featured in the 2012 Wisconsin Film Festival with a double screening on 4/20 and 4/21.

Richards would later go on with Reuben Glaser, creator of 2012's "Little Face Mitt" meme, to create a widely covered segment at a political rally in Appleton, Wisconsin for then-candidate Donald Trump during his 2016 Presidential Campaign where they managed to get into the press box alongside reporters from CNN, NBC, MSNBC, and others, despite the Trump campaign's rigid entrance requirements and Richards and Glaser's blatant lack of adequate credentials.

In 2018, Richards' fifth short film "Nicolas Cage Mother Mary" premiered at the Milwaukee Short Film Festival on September 8 where it won an Audience Favorite award. Richards was also featured on a filmmaker panel at the event discussing film in Wisconsin, hosted by Michael Viers of "The Shamelist Picture Show".

=== Kintou Media Company ===
In 2019, Richards announced on the official site of King's Tower Productions that control of its assets would be assumed by a new company, Kintou Media. Kintou Media Company was officially formed in 2020. In 2021, Richards completed and released his first children's picture book as author and illustrator, The Tocks on the Clock, which became available in hardcover and ebook formats on December 1, 2021.

In 2023, Richards began releasing his first new series with Kintou Media, "Japan by Foot."

== Filmography ==
Since 2006, Jozef K. Richards has independently produced, directed, and released 3 feature films, 5 short films, and 4 web series.

Year(s)	Title	Format	Director	Producer	Writer	Actor	Editor	D.P.	Soundtrack
2006	"Three Suits"	Short	✔︎	✔︎	✔︎	✔︎	✔︎		
2008	"Seffy D"	Short	✔︎	✔︎	✔︎	✔︎	✔︎		✔︎
2010	"Rodents"	Short	✔︎	✔︎	✔︎	✔︎	✔︎		✔︎
2011	The Amateur Monster Movie	Feature	✔︎	✔︎	✔︎	✔︎	✔︎		✔︎
2013	The Wayward Sun	Feature	✔︎	✔︎	✔︎	✔︎	✔︎		✔︎
2013–15	"Friday Night Weekly"	Series	✔︎	✔︎	✔︎	✔︎	✔︎	✔︎	✔︎
2014	"Un Jardín Adentro de La Violencia"	Short	✔︎	✔︎	✔︎	✔︎	✔︎	✔︎	
2015	"Poké Men & Women"	Short Series	✔︎	✔︎	✔︎	✔︎	✔︎	✔︎	
2015–17	"Holy Shit"	Series	✔︎	✔︎	✔︎	✔︎	✔︎	✔︎	
2016	"King's Tower Quarterly"	Series	✔︎	✔︎		✔︎	✔︎		
2017	Batman & Jesus	Feature	✔︎	✔︎	✔︎	✔︎	✔︎	✔︎	✔︎
2018	"Nicolas Cage Mother Mary"	Short	✔︎	✔︎	✔︎	✔︎	✔︎	✔︎	
2023–	"Japan by Foot"	Series	✔︎	✔︎	✔︎	✔︎	✔︎	✔︎	

== Bibliography ==
Year(s)	Title	Style	Author	Illustrator	Publisher
2021	The Tocks on the Clock	Picture Book	✔︎	✔︎	✔︎
