= Syne International Film Festival =

Not-for-Profit, India

SYNE Foundation
- Motto in English: Collectively we can change this World
- Type: Private Foundation
- Established: 2008; 18 years ago
- Founders: Ginu George and Dr. Sunley Lissy George
- Location: Muvattupuzha, Kerala, India
- Website: www.syne.org about.syne.org chalana.syne.org

SYNE Foundation is a mission led organisation dedicated to shaping a sustainable, equitable, and socially resilient future. Founded in 2008, it is one of the oldest foundations focused on Sustainability, Inclusive Development. Our work is grounded in the belief that meaningful philanthropy must extend beyond giving, it must empower people, protect the planet, and create long term systems of opportunity.

== History ==
SYNE Foundation was founded by Ginu George in 2008 at Muvattupuzha of Kerala, India. Ginu George founded Chalana, a society for social causes in the year 1998, which was merged with SYNE Foundation. Chalana was registered under the Societies Act of India and had over 100+ members. In 2008, the Chalana Film Festival (CIFF) was officially renamed to SYNE International Film Festival (SIFF).

In 2010, SYNE Foundation Launched a free fundraising platform for not-for-profits, which is currently used by more than 100's of not-for-profits across the world.

== Chalana International Film Festival ==
Chalana pioneered a cultural movement where film and literature ignite new creative voices. Chalana began as a cultural foundation dedicated to nurturing creative expression, critical thinking, and artistic engagement in Muvattupuzha, Kerala. Founded by Mr. Ginu George in 1998, Chalana became the First Film Society in Muvattupuzha in the year 2000, and was formally registered with the Societies Registrar, Kerala State Chalachitra Academy and the Federation of Film Societies of India.

Beyond cinema, Chalana also contributed to the region's literary landscape through its magazine Ezuthu—meaning “writing.” Ezuthu provided a platform for emerging voices in literature, criticism, and culture, encouraging budding writers, students, and thinkers to experiment with storytelling, poetry, and reflective essays. Together, the film society and the magazine created a vibrant creative community that valued artistic curiosity and intellectual dialogue.

Building on this cultural foundation, Chalana launched the Chalana International Film Festival (CIFF) in 2001. The festival brought world cinema to Muvattupuzha at a time when access to international films was extremely limited. The debut edition opened with the Tibetan film The Cup (1999 film) and featured 20 carefully curated films across four days, conducted by Chalana Film Society.

In the years that followed, CIFF expanded its reach through themed editions, community screenings, and partnerships:

2001 - 1st CIFF: The debut edition opened with the Tibetan film The Cup (1999 film) and featured 20 carefully curated films across four days

2002 - 2nd CIFF: Conducted with the Muvattupuzha Press Club; the festival opened at the Muvattupuzha Municipal Park with 800+ film enthusiasts and featured 16 films centred on Family & Love. The festival screened its first movie in the Muvattupuzha Municipal Park for 1000's of Public film supporters. The festival featured 16 Films categorizing Family & Love as the main theme. The festival was inaugurated by Priyanandanan, young film director in Malayalam language.

2003 - 3rd CIFF: Held at Perumbalam Island in Alleppey with regional arts communities, showcasing international films including No Man’s Land (2001 film), featuring the war in between Bosnia and Serbia. The festival featured 16 films including short films and documentaries.

2005 - 4th CIFF: Themed War and Peace (2002_film) by Anand Patwardhan and dedicated to Ali Ismail Abbas of Iraq; inaugurated with Kandahar and featuring impactful documentaries like Godse. The film festival was dedicated to Twelve-year-old Ali Ismail Abbas of Iraq who suffered 60% burns in the attack which destroyed his Baghdad home and killed his family. Ali lost two hands and legs in the Second Gulf War. The inaugural film was Kandahar (2001_film) by Mohsen Makhmalbaf. The festival also featured the documentary Godse.

2005 - Touring Talkies: Conducted with the Kerala State Chalachitra Academy, celebrating 100 years of Malayalam and Indian cinema with 18 curated works.

Beyond screenings, CIFF hosted filmmaker workshops, seminars, discussion forums, and outreach activities in rural and urban communities, bringing meaningful cinema to audiences often overlooked in mainstream film circuits.

In 2008, Chalana merged with SYNE Foundation, combining their expertise in film, literature, and community development to create a larger, integrated ecosystem for social and cultural engagement. This strategic union strengthened their ability to drive impactful initiatives, foster community participation, and promote arts, education, and sustainable development at scale.

== Chalana Literary Magazine - Ezhuthu ==
Ezhuthu, in English 'writing' was an literary magazine published by Chalana and sold for Rs. 2. Jeevan Job Thomas was the Executive Editor and Nishad VH was the Editor and Varghese Antony as the General Editor for the magazine. The magazine published multiple editions and provided an opportunity for budding writers in Malayalam language.
