= It's All Good =

It's All Good may refer to:

== Fictional characters ==
- Saul Goodman (derived from "S'all good, man"), a character on the AMC TV series Breaking Bad and Better Call Saul

== Films ==
- It's All Good (2016 film), a film by FND Films
- It's All Good: The Damien Dempsey Story, a 2003 documentary about Irish singer-songwriter Damien Dempsey

== Literature ==
- It's All Good, a book by Andrew Daddo
- It's All Good (In Your Dreams), a children's novel by Karen McCombie
- It's All Good: Delicious, Easy Recipes that Will Make You Look Good and Feel Great (2013), a cookbook by Gwyneth Paltrow and Julia Turshen

== Music ==
=== Albums ===
- It's All Good (MC Breed album)
- It's All Good (Joe Nichols album)
- It's All Good (Suga-T album)
- It's All Good, an album by Jad Fair and Jason Willett
- It's All Good, an album by Mick Ralphs
- It's All Good, a mix album produced by Tim Lee
- It's All Good, an EP by Seasick Steve
- It's All Good, a 2014 Best Of album by Damien Dempsey

=== Songs ===
- "It's All Good" (Bob Dylan song) a song by Bob Dylan from Together Through Life
- "It's All Good", a song by DMX from Flesh of My Flesh, Blood of My Blood
- "It's All Good", a song by Damien Dempsey from Seize the Day
- "It's All Good", a song by Devo
- "It's All Good", a song by El Perro del Mar from Look! It's El Perro del Mar!
- "It's All Good", a song by Fantasia Barrino from Free Yourself
- "It's All Good", a song by Hammer from The Funky Headhunter
- "It's All Good", a song by Khalid from Sincere
- "It's All Good", a song by Master P from Ghetto Bill
- "It's All Good", a song by Theory of a Deadman from Say Nothing
- "It's All Good", a song by Toby Keith from Unleashed
- "It's All Good", a song by Will Smith from Big Willie Style
- "Tha Hood (It's All Good)", a song the 1999 film soundtrack The Wood
- "It's All Good", a song by Ne-Yo & Cher Lloyd
