= Galway African Film Festival =

- Location: Galway, Ireland
- Founded: 2008
- Disestablished: 2019
- Festival date: late May / early June
- Language: African languages, French, English

Galway African Film Festival (GAFF) was an annual African film festival which took place annually in Galway in Ireland in late May / early June. It was typically scheduled to coincide with Africa Day, and aimed to "showcase the quality and diversity [..] of African films". The festival was organised by the Galway One World Centre in collaboration with the Huston School of Film & Digital Media and the Galway Film Society. Venues for screenings of films included the Town Hall Theatre, Nuns Island Theatre and Huston School of Film & Digital Media. Previous festivals were supported by Irish Aid, Galway City Arts Office, Galway City Council and the Galway Advertiser. The final festival was held in 2019, with organisers confirming that no festival would be held in 2020 and that the event was "no more" by 2022.

== History ==
The Galway African Film Festival was established in 2008. Previous festival programmes included films from several genres of African cinema, including comedy, science fiction, horror and contemporary films.

Guests at the 2009 festival included Tandeka Matatu, one of the producers of Jerusalema (South Africa). Films shown in 2010 included The Figurine Araromire (Nigeria), Mascarades (France/Algeria) and A Sting in a Tale (Ghana), while in 2011, the festival's programme included Benda Bilili (Congo), Microphone (Egypt) and The Atlete (Ethiopia). In 2012, showings included Viva Riva, an award-winning Congolese drama, two Egyptian films about the Arab Spring of 2011 and an Ethiopian / UK co-production, Town of Runners.

The 11th Galway African Film festival was held over three days in June 2018. The 2019 festival programme included showings of the documentaries Finding Fela and Anbessa.

There was no event in 2020. By 2022, the festival was no longer running, with a Facebook post from the organisers indicating that the "Galway African Film Festival is no more".

== See also ==
- List of film festivals
