= Even Hitler Had a Girlfriend =

- Directed by: Ronnie Cramer
- Written by: T. G. Baker
- Produced by: David Manning
- Starring: Andren Scott; Monica McFarland; Sarah Young; Sheila Traister
- Music by: Alarming Trends
- Distributed by: Scorched Earth Productions
- Release date: December 25, 1991
- Running time: 89 minutes
- Country: United States
- Language: English

Even Hitler Had a Girlfriend is a 1991 black comedy film about a lonely security guard who spends his life savings on call girls in less than two weeks. It was directed by artist/filmmaker Ronnie Cramer and is based on a story by T. G. Baker. Shot in Denver, Colorado, Omaha, Nebraska and at Mount Rushmore in South Dakota, Even Hitler is celebrated in cult film circles for its extremely dark sense of humor and its copious amount of female nudity.

== Plot ==
Marcus Templeton is a thirty-year-old, unmarried security guard who describes himself as "a lonely, desperate man." He works at night and spends his days looking at pornography and takes to peeping into windows in the hopes of seeing naked women. Marcus is slightly overweight and spends a fair amount of screen time obsessing about his physical health, finally resorting to wearing a corset and using questionable weight-loss products such as Reduce-O-Creme, which promises to "melt, melt, melt your fat away" upon application.

After several disastrous attempts at dating women, Marcus resorts to seeing prostitutes. He begins to secretly record his encounters with the call girls, first with a small tape recorder and then with a hidden video camera. He quickly spends his entire life savings and contracts sexually transmitted diseases, all the while losing his grip on reality (his father "appears" on the television screen and berates Marcus).

When a disagreeable prostitute discovers she is being surreptitiously videotaped, she pulls a handgun out of her purse, shoots Marcus and steals his video equipment. As Marcus lies bleeding to death he grabs the nearby bottle of Reduce-O-Creme and applies it to his belly in a final, futile gesture.

== Cast ==
- Andren Scott as Marcus Templeton
- Monica McFarland as Call Girl
- Sheila Traister as News Reporter
- Karen Pombo as Call Girl
- Jim Norton as Dad
- Christie Cass as Call Girl
- Karen Zaczkowski as Sunbather
- Sarah Young as Call Girl
- Karen Burns as Call Girl

== Sequel ==
A sequel, The Hitler Tapes was released in 1994 despite actor Andren Scott's death before the film could be completely shot.

== Miscellaneous ==
- Even Hitler Had a Girlfriend was named "Best Drive-In Movie of the Year" by cult film critic Joe Bob Briggs.
- Several bands subsequently recorded songs titled Even Hitler Had a Girlfriend, including Grand Pricks from Raleigh, North Carolina and The Mr. T Experience from Berkeley, California. See Even Hitler Had a Girlfriend (song).
- Andren Scott, the star of the film, never found a niche in acting. In 1994 while working as a night clerk at a convenience store he was fatally shot during a robbery.
