= Port Said International Film Festival =

Annual film festival in Egypt

Port Said International Film Festival مهرجان بورسعيد السينمائي الدولي
- Location: Port Said, Egypt
- Founded: 18 September 2025; 13 months ago
- Awards: Golden Lighthouse Award
- Artistic director: Walid Atef
- Festival date: 1-5 December
- Language: International
- Website: portsaid-iff.com

The Port Said International Film Festival is an annual international film festival held in Port Said, Egypt. Founded in 2025, the festival is held annually at the Port Said Cultural Entertainment Center and under the auspices of the Egyptian Ministry of Culture. Port Said Association for Performing and Cultural Arts was the founder of the festival in 2025. The first edition of the festival took place between 18 and 22 September 2025 under the name of the great actor and son of Port Said Mahmoud Yassin. The president of the festival is Ahmed Assar.

== History ==
The Port Said International Film Festival (PIFF) began in 2025 under the theme "Cinema That Illuminates". Its inaugural edition took place from September 18 to 22, 2025, and was dedicated to the renowned artist Mahmoud Yassin, in recognition of his significant contributions to cinema and his roots in Port Said Governorate.

The second edition of the festival is scheduled for December 1 to 5, 2026, under the theme "Cinema That Revives Hope". This edition is dedicated to the late actor Salah Zulfikar, while Greece has been selected as the guest of honor, a tribute to the historical and human ties between Port Said and Greece that reflect the Greek presence which left an indelible mark on the city’s history, as well as its cultural and social identity, serving as a testament to a city that has, throughout its history, remained open to diverse cultures.

The festival honored Tunisian actress Dorra during its first edition in 2025, while it was decided that actor Hussein Fahmy, actor Hamdy El Wazeer and the film director Sandra Nashaat would be honored during its second edition in 2026.

== See also ==
- Egyptian Catholic Center for Cinema Festival
- Cairo International Film Festival
- List of film festivals
