= Fetzer (surname) =

Fetzer is a surname. Notable people with the surname include:

- Bill Fetzer (1884–1959), American football, basketball, and baseball coach
- Bob Fetzer (1887–1968), American football coach and track and field coach
- Brigitte Fetzer (born 1956), German volleyball player
- Christine Fetzer, American bodybuilder and model
- Emil B. Fetzer (1916–2009), American architect
- Herman Fetzer (1899–1935), American writer, poet and columnist
- James H. Fetzer (born 1940), American conspiracy theorist and writer
- John Fetzer (1901–1991), American businessman and Major League Baseball executive
- John Fetzer (1840–1900), American politician
- Tom Fetzer (born 1955), American politician
