= Highway Amazon =

2001 film by Ronnie Cramer

- Directed by: Ronnie Cramer
- Starring: Christine Fetzer
- Release date: 2001
- Country: United States
- Language: English

Highway Amazon is a 2001 documentary film directed by Ronnie Cramer.

It chronicles the life of body builder Christine Fetzer, as she travels across the United States wrestling men in hotel rooms. During the course of the film, Fetzer reminisces about her former career as an exotic dancer and is shown lifting weights and engaging in several erotic wrestling matches, as well as indulging her clients in muscle worship.

Highway Amazon was named Best Documentary at the Humboldt Film Festival in Arcata, California.
