= Oru Kuprasidha Payyan =

2018 film directed by Madhupal

- Theatrical release poster
- Directed by: Madhupal
- Written by: Jeevan Job Thomas
- Produced by: T. S. Udayan; A. S. Manoj
- Starring: Tovino Thomas; Nimisha Sajayan; Anu Sithara; Saranya Ponvannan
- Cinematography: Noushad Shereef
- Edited by: V. Sajan
- Music by: Ouseppachan
- Production company: V Cinemas International
- Distributed by: V Cinemas International; Sree Priya Combines
- Release date: 9 November 2018
- Country: India
- Language: Malayalam

Oru Kuprasidha Payyan (transl. A notorious youngster) is a 2018 Indian crime drama film directed by Madhupal and written by Jeevan Job Thomas and produced by V Cinemas International. The film stars Tovino Thomas, Nimisha Sajayan, Anu Sithara and Saranya Ponvannan in lead roles. It released on 9 November 2018 coinciding with Deepavali. The film is based on a sensational Murder case.

== Plot ==
Ajayan is a timid young man who works in a nearby hotel. He often travels to meet Chembaga Ammal who runs a catering service and supplies idlis to the hotel where Ajayan is working. He shares a bond with Chenbakam as she treats him like her own son. Ajayan falls for Jalaja, a co-worker wish to marry each other. One dark night, a loud noise is heard from Chembaga Ammal's house around 12:30 am. It is found that Chembaga Ammal has been stabbed and she was struggling for her life. Neighbours see a person running from the spot. Chembaga Ammal died in the hospital and the police is informed about the incident. For one year, the case did not end and the culprits are not found by the local police. This led to frustration among the public and the case is transferred to the Crime Branch. Pressurized, the crime branch police decided to fix Ajayan as the culprit to solve the case. They created suitable evidence to fix Ajayan as the murderer.

Ajayan accepted the crime because of the torture that he had experienced by the police. While in remand, a convict asks him to appeal to the judge to fix a lawyer for him on his side. The court points to Hanna as the legal aid for Ajayan. Initially, she hesitates to take the case, but after unraveling the truth behind the case, she shows real interest in it. Hanna proves Ajayan innocent after a series of investigations and arguments in court. She won the case against her former senior lawyer, Santosh Narayan.

== Cast ==
- Tovino Thomas as Ajayan/Ajmal
- Saranya Ponvannan as CP Chenbagam (Chembaga Ammal)
- Nimisha Sajayan as Adv. Hannah Elizabeth
- Anu Sithara as Jalaja
- Siddique as Bharathan
- Dileesh Pothan as Dr.Suresh Babu
- Shwetha Menon as Doctor Renuka Subramaniam
- Alencier Ley Lopez as Bhaskaran
- Jojo_Cyriac_George as Ravi
- Nedumudi Venu as Adv. Santosh Narayanan
- G. Suresh Kumar as Judge Jayadevan
- Unnimaya Prasad as Adv. Vanaja Prakash
- Sreelakshmi as Sheela
- Maala Parvathi as Ajayan's stepmother
- Sujith Shankar as DYSP Simon George
- Sibi Thomas as CI Praveen Kumar
- Sudheer Karamana
- Balu Varghese as Jinesh
- Sridevika as Adv.Anuradha Sreedhar
- Manju Vani as Neighbour
- Arun as Anwar
- V. K. Baiju as Rajeev
- Valsala Menon as Hanna's grandmother
- Madhupal in cameo
- Binny Tom as Elizabeth
- Ala S Nayana

== Production ==
Principal photography took place in Vadayar.

== Release ==
The film was released on 8 November 2018.

== Accolades ==
Award	Category	Winner
49th Kerala State Film Awards	Best Actress	Nimisha Sajayan
42nd Kerala Film Critics Association Awards	Best Film	Oru Kuprasidha Payyan
42nd Kerala Film Critics Association Awards	Best Actress	Nimisha Sajayan
42nd Kerala Film Critics Association Awards	Best Sound Design	Harikumar
