= FENAVID =

Annual film festival in Santa Cruz, Bolivia

FENAVID International Film Festival (Spanish: Festival Internacional de Cine de Santa Cruz (FECSC)) is an annual film festival that has been held in the city of Santa Cruz de la Sierra, Bolivia since 2001. It is organised by FUNDAV, a not-for-profit organisation established by Bolivian film producer and director Alejandro Fuentes. Both short and feature-length films are included. A special competition the Santa Cruz 100X100 tasks small teams of producers to create a short film within 100 hours.

== Recent editions ==
The 2024 edition of FENAVID ran under the slogan "Seven days of pure cinema". The festival received over 1,200 submissions in that edition, selecting around 70 works from countries including Bolivia, Argentina, Colombia, Spain, Mexico, Venezuela, Brazil and others.

== Venues ==
Venues have included the AECID Training centre.

== Prizes ==
Prizes are awarded in the following categories:

- Fiction Feature Film
- Documentary Feature Film
- Fiction Short Film
- Documentary Short Film
- Animation Short Film
- University Fiction Short Film
- University Documentary Short Film
- Children's Fiction Short Film
- Children's Animation Short Film
- National Music Video Category.
- SIGNIS Award for the best documentary and fiction feature films.
- Special Audience Award (Fiction Feature Film)

== See also ==
- Cinema of Bolivia
- List of film festivals in South America
