= Castle Rock Film Festival =

The Castle Rock Film Festival (CRFF) is a film festival that takes place annually in the state of Colorado, in the United States. Established in 2009, the festival is held in late September or early October in Castle Rock, Colorado and showcases films and screenplays from the Rocky Mountain Region of the U.S. (AZ, CO, ID, MT, NM, NV, UT, and WY). The festival comprises competitive sections for dramatic and documentary films (feature-length, short and student films) and for feature-length screenplays.

This festival is unusual in that the submitters benefit from CRFF's unique guarantees: a) every film/screenplay will be watched/read in its entirety, and b) submitters will be provided with in-depth, confidential judging feedback.

== History ==
The Castle Rock Film Festival started in April 2009 with its first festival screening dates being September 11–13, 2009. It attracted a collection of films and screen plays from its original 5 Rocky Mountain states (Colorado, Montana, New Mexico, Utah, and Wyoming). The festival accepted films (short, student, and feature), feature screenplays, trailers and actor reels. Its first night was dubbed "Trailer Park" in which movie trailers and actor reels were played. Additional movie related entertainment was provided by an appearance by the 501st Legion. Awards were presented by Randy Reed (Mayor of Castle Rock, Colorado) and Laura Grey (Colorado Film, TV and Media) for the categories of feature (first place "The Heart of Texas", runner up "My Life as a Baby Boomer"), best short (first place "The Shaman's Apprentice", runner up "Quillions"), best student (first place "Shell Shock", runner up "Fast Girls, Slow Bikes") and best screenplay (first place "The Bit", runner up "Wrong Place, Wrong Time").

In 2010, the festival expanded its eligibility of Rocky Mountain states to be as defined by the U.S. Library of Congress, which includes the additional states of Arizona, Nevada, and Idaho. The festival included an actor and studio class with two professional acting coaches: Paul Neal Rohr of the Rohrering Success Radio Hour, and Patrick Sheridan of the Emerging Filmmakers Project. The studio class was taught by Teresa Garcia, a Colorado film producer and CRFF organizer, and Laffrey Witbrod of the Colorado Film School. Extra equipment was supplied by Light Services Inc, of Denver. The script reading session, hosted by Mark Mook, a Colorado actor and CRFF organizer, read portions the two winning screenplays employing local actors. The special guest on Saturday night was Bob Garner, a former Disney executive and resident of Colorado. Awards were handed out by Kevin Shand of the Colorado Office of Television, Film and Media, and by Ryan Reilly, the Mayor of Castle Rock.

In 2011, the festival again expanded its eligibility to further include Kansas, Nebraska, North Dakota, Oklahoma, South Dakota and Texas.

As of 2018, the festival web site is no longer existent and the festival may no longer be held.

== See also ==
List of film festivals
