= Ali Ismail Abbas =

Iraqi man

Ali Ismail Abbas (born 1991) is an Iraqi man who drew media attention after being severely injured as a child in a night-time aerial missile attack near Baghdad during the United States' 2003 invasion of Iraq.

== Injury ==
During the attack, two American missiles landed on his family's home, killing his parents (his mother was pregnant with another child at the time), his brother and 13 other members of his family. Both of Ali's arms had to be amputated and third-degree burns covered at least 35 percent of his body. He was 12 years old at the time. He underwent treatment in Kuwait, and later in London, where he was fitted with robotic prosthetic arms, paid for by the Kuwaiti government. He no longer uses the arms, having found them too heavy and unwieldy, although he wore artificial arms while attending school so as not to draw attention to himself. He attended the Hall School Wimbledon.

== Citizenship ==
On January 1, 2010, it was announced Ali Abbas would get a British passport. Ali had offers from other countries, such as Canada and the United States, but he turned them down because they would not take his friend with him.

== Publicity ==
In 2004, The Ali Abbas Story was written about Ali by Jane Warren and published by HarperCollins.

He was featured on 60 Minutes on 13 May 2007.

He was featured in the September 2011 edition of Time magazine.

== Limbless Association ==
The Limbless Association (LA) set up a dedicated fund to assist those rendered amputees by the Iraq conflict. During a visit to Iraq LA Chairman Zafar Khan met Ahmad Hamza, a 14-year-old boy who had also been injured in the Iraq conflict, resulting in his right leg and left hand being amputated. The Limbless Association pledged to use the Ali Fund to help both Ali and Ahmad. LA was the legal guardian for both Ali and Ahmad until they reached 18 years of age.

== The Baghdad Bikers ==
Ali and his friends go on a publicity bike ride every year, called the Baghdad Bikers.
