= Rome Independent Cinema Festival =

Annual film festival in Rome, Italy

- Location: Rome, Italy
- Established: August 2018
- Founded by: Henrik Friis de Magalhães e Meneses
- Website: https://www.romafestivale.com/
- 2020 2019

Rome Independent Cinema Festival is an annual film festival held in August in the Rome, Italy. The festival is organized by HF Productions, and was first held in August 2018.

== The festival ==
Rome Independent Cinema Festival was first started in August 2018, and is held annually at the screening venue, Casa del Cinema located in the Villa Borghese in Rome. The event is organized by Copenhagen-based production company, HF Productions and aims to promote Italian independent cinema. In 2019, the event was co-sponsored by Devent VFX Studio and Fonderia delle Arti.

At the 2nd event in 2019, filmmakers Toni D’Angelo, Mario Sesti, Christian Carmosino Mereu and Chanel Agura were the jury panelists for the festival.

== Rome Independent Cinema Festival awards winners ==
=== 2018 ===
The following are the event winners of the 2018 Rome Independent Cinema Festival:

- Best Feature Film: Paradize 89 (2018), director Madara Dišlere
- Best Short Film: Mazeppa (2017), director Jonathan Lago Lago
- Best Comedy: Guardians
- Best Drama: A Touch of Spring
- Best Experimental: Dreaming in March
- Best Foreign Film: Anissa 2002 (2015), director Fabienne Facco
- Best Cinematography: The Legend of Ben Hall (2018), cinematographer Peter Szilveszter
- Best Editing: La Cumbre (2017), director Dana Romanoff
- Best Writing: The Night Witches by Steven Prowse
- Best Feature Documentary: The March of Hope (2018), director Jamie Croft
- Best Short Documentary: El Gallo (2018), director Michael Medoway
- Best Animated Short: Goodnight

=== 2019 ===
The following are the event winners of the 2019 Rome Independent Cinema Festival:

- Best Feature Film: Olma Djon (2018), director Victoria Yakubov
- Best Short Film: Strange Cities Are Familiar (2018), director Saeed Taji Farouky
- Best Comedy: Only Good Things
- Best Drama: A Thousand Miles Behind (2018), director Nathan Wetherington
- Best Experimental: Ansage Ende (2019), director Stijn Verhoeff
- Best Foreign Film: Fever
- Best Cinematography: Chronos
- Best Editing: The Houses We Were (2018), director Arianna Lodeserto
- Best Writing: (Dis)Honoured
- Best Feature Documentary: The Dream of Homer (2018), director Emiliano Aiello
- Best Short Documentary: Playground Addiction (2019), directors Carlo Furgeri Gilbert, Marzio Mirabella, and Niccolò Rastrelli
- Best Animated: Lemons – Deseisaocho la banda (2018), Daniela Godel
- Best Italian Film: Where is Europe
- Special Mention for Best Comedy: Swindler
