= FND Films =

Sketch comedy group

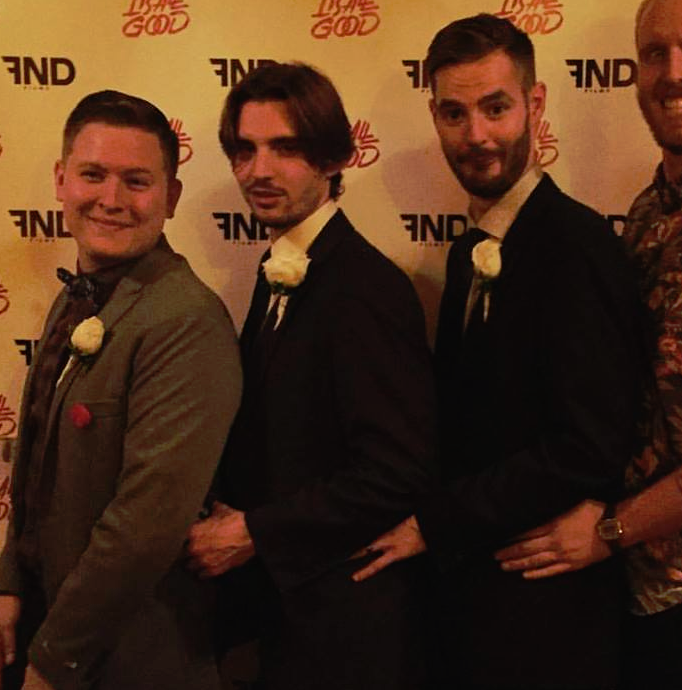
- The FND Films boys at the Music Box Theatre in Chicago at the premiere of their movie "It's All Good."
- Born: Aaron Fronk; September 1, 1989 (age 37); Chicago, Illinois; Vincent DeGaetano; December 2, 1988 (age 37); Twinsburg, Ohio; Cooper "The Coop" Johnson; Unknown; River Forest, Illinois
- Occupations: Actors; comedians

YouTube information
- Channel: fndfilms
- Years active: 2005–present
- Genres: Comedy; surrealism
- Subscribers: 171 thousand
- Views: 61.4 million
- Last updated: April 2, 2024
- Website: www.fndfilms.com

FND Films is an American web-based sketch comedy trio consisting of Aaron Fronk (born September 1, 1989), Vincent DeGaetano, (born December 2, 1988), and Cooper "The Coop" Johnson.

They have been releasing comedy videos since 2005, gaining over 100 million views and 175,000 subscribers, and have since released a number of theatrical films. Their film It's All Good (2016) raised $75,000 on crowdfunding website IndieGogo in 2014 and appeared two years later to have unethically spent the money without releasing a movie. Ultimately it was revealed by Esquire to have been an elaborate prank, and FNDFilms did indeed produce and release a movie featuring a plot about the fictional scenario.

== History ==
=== Classic era (2005–2011) ===
FND Films first gained popularity in the mid-to-late-2000s and are seen by many as one of the earliest adopters of the website YouTube. Videos on their main channel (initially known as "Fronk2107"), such as Gay Zombie, Corndog, Lightsaber, Most Dramatically Normal Day Ever and Magic Mentos gave them initial success and have collectively accumulated 17,871,056 views as of January 20, 2017. The channel has over 55 million views altogether. Concurrently with the official videos of FND Films' main channel, the trio has released videos on the side channel ThatOneKid100, including their most popular video Annoying, which has been viewed over 26 million times.

Whereas their videos from between 2005 and 2007 followed a theme of primarily low budget low-brow comedy and parodying movie trailers, the trio moved on to broader comedy in the following years. Most notably, their video Celery, which featured Vincent and the Coop aggressively making out, was featured on the television program Tosh.0.

After failing to gain traction in Hollywood with their unsuccessful attempts to create a television program titled FND TV, the trio transitioned into releasing episodes of their popular series FND Dailies.

=== Inactivity and transition to feature films ===
Eventually, FND Films slowly distanced itself from YouTube and the fan base they had built and for several years halted production of FND Dailies altogether. From 2012 to 2016, FND Films were largely quiet, only appearing in occasional projects from other filmmakers, such as the 2012 film from Drew Morris known as Red Balls, and Year Of The Snake by Nic Collins. In 2013, it was revealed they had shifted their focus to producing theatrical films with their release of the short Punching.

==== It's All Good ====
On September 27, 2014, FND Films launched an IndieGogo campaign to raise $75,000 to fund a movie titled It's All Good. They successfully raised more than the goal amount less than a month later on October 23. They closed their campaign with $77,915 in donations from various individuals.

In 2016, two years after their IndieGogo campaign, the trio caused worldwide controversy when they announced they could no longer complete production of the movie, which raised speculation that they had improperly spent the money on themselves. They were widely panned and heavily criticized by websites like The Daily Dot, Yahoo!, and Metro for their supposed embezzlement of such an amount of money and the lack of any recourse donors were given by IndieGogo. On September 22, FND Films founder Aaron Fronk gave a morose interview to Fox 32 Chicago where he once again claimed the money was gone and could not be reimbursed. This led to further ire and condemnation.

Some weeks later, an article by Esquire Magazine revealed that the entire controversy had been an elaborate prank orchestrated by the trio. The plot itself of the film was ultimately about scamming their donors. They were largely lauded, nationally and abroad, for their risky attempt towards marketing their film, with TechCrunch claiming it all to have been an "epic, expertly executed troll".

It's All Good premiered October 2016 at Chicago's Music Box Theatre.

=== Collaborations and Present Day ===
After the release of It's All Good, Johnson moved to Los Angeles and temporarily left the group. Fronk and DeGaetano remained in Chicago as a duo for a time until relocating to Los Angeles and reuniting with Johnson once again. The three have remained active on YouTube since. Aside from YouTube, FND Films also concentrate on corporate and professional freelance video, having worked for Taco Bell, Big Lots, Motorola, KFC, and Discover Card.

While still based in the Midwest during the post-production period of It's All Good, the trio appeared sparingly in the projects of others, including Jozef K. Richards' web-series Friday Night Weekly as themselves, and in the short-lived series Poké Men & Women as a destructive cadre of poorly behaved and reckless Mr. Mime alongside comedian Reuben Glaser in the role of the hapless Scientist Roger. Fronk appeared by himself as "Batmaniac" in the 2017 film Batman and Jesus starring Paul Provenza. DeGaetano can be seen in the projects Beasts, Augmented, Two Minutes Till Impact, and will appear in In The Backseat. The Coop has been very active since relocating to Los Angeles, racking up several appearances in films such as Strongroom, The Artist, Thanks a Latte, and Kappa Force. He has finished shooting and is slated to also appear in 2018's Rabbit's Foot.

== Filmography ==
Films and Appearances by FND Films
Year	Title	Role	Director(s)
2010	Action World	Filmmakers	Aaron Fronk, Vince DeGaetano, Cooper Johnson
2013	Punching	Filmmakers	Aaron Fronk
2013	Grundy The Meat Man	Filmmakers	Aaron Fronk, Vince DeGaetano, Cooper Johnson
2014	"FND for Vendetta" (episode of "Friday Night Weekly")	Guest Stars	Jozef K. Richards
2015	Year Of The Snake	Guest Stars	Nic Collins
2015	Poké Men & Women	Guest Stars	Jozef K. Richards
2015	Vigilant	Guest Stars	Craig Deering and Allen Murphy
2016	It's All Good	Filmmakers	Aaron Fronk
2017	Pizza Boys	Guest Stars	Drew Morris
2017	Pizza Night	Filmmakers	Aaron Fronk
2017	#WhoKilledHeather	Guest Stars	Neal E. Fischer and Kevin Kirchman
