= Cinemela Film Festival =

Film festival in Delhi, India

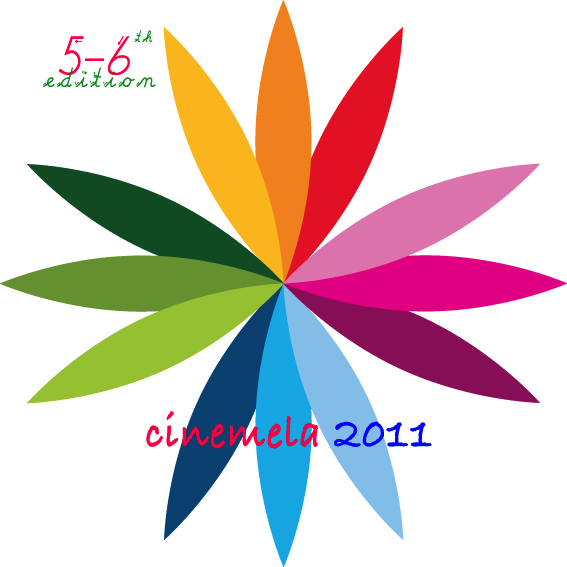
Cinemela 2011

Cinemela (सिनेमेला Carnival of Cinema) is an annual film festival organized in New Delhi, India since 2006. This festival provides the best stage to young filmmakers from all over the globe to showcase their works. The festival has been recognized by the Limca Book of World Records for its uniqueness.

== History ==
Cinemela was started in 2006 by enthusiasts Prakash K. Ray and Rishika Mehrishi, soon joined by Khush-Hal Singh, Chandan Srivastawa, Kumar Pranab, Muntazir Qaimi, Javed Naqi and a few more friends from Jawaharlal Nehru University, New Delhi. The aim of the festival is to create space for the films made by the young filmmakers. Apart from many short films and documentaries from India, the festival screened films made by the final year students of the film institutes and schools in Germany. In 2006 Rahul Bose's short film "Ctrl+Alt+Del" was premiered here.

Goethe-Institut, Max Mueller Bhavan, New Delhi (the German Cultural Centre in India) supported the festival in 2006 and 2007.

In 2007, films from Germany, Russia, Ukraine, Estonia, Czech Republic, Latvia, Poland, United States and Israel were screened. From India, it had received films in Rajasthani, Hindi, Assamese, Marathi, Bhojpuri and languages of Jharkhand. The festival was inaugurated by Aruna Vasudev, the person behind of Osians Cine Fan film festival and the editor of Cinemaya. Apart from her veteran journalist Prananjoy Guha Thakurta and Prof Parul Dave Mukherji, then Dean of School of Arts & Aesthetics, JNU, were also present in the inaugural session.

The 2008 Cinemela festival opened with the Academy Award-nominated film "The Little Terrorist" by Ashvin Kumar. The director was present during the screening and had a long session with the audience after the film. As a special screening, the first Indian Film Raja Harishchandra was also screened.

As an interesting initiative, Cinemela in 2009 showcased the short films of India Cinema veterans such as Smita Patil, Jaya Bachchan, Vidhu Vinod Chopra and Suresh Oberoi. The festival also presented films on many socio-cultural and contemporary themes underlining the eagerness of the young filmmakers towards a meaningful engagement with the world around.

== Venue ==
Films during the festival are screened at various places inside the campus of Jawaharlal Nehru University in New Delhi. Important institutions and organizations like JNU, JNU Students' Union, Goethe-Institut/Max Mueller Bhavan, British Council, Film and Television Institute of India, Amnesty International, Control Arms Foundation of India, The Foundation for Universal Responsibility of His Holiness the Dalai Lama, Asia Pacific Youth Network, INSAF have extended support to the festival in different ways.
