= Israeli Film Festival of Philadelphia =

The Israeli Film Festival of Philadelphia is a local film festival based in Philadelphia, PA whose goal is bring Israeli film to Philadelphia.

The festival was founded in 1996 by Mindy Chriqui, Aryeh Rudnik and Ruti Kulka. The first season began at Philadelphia's Gershman Y on Saturday, November 9, 1996 with Eytan Fox's "Song of the Siren".
