= Pluk de nacht =

Film festival in Amsterdam, the Netherlands

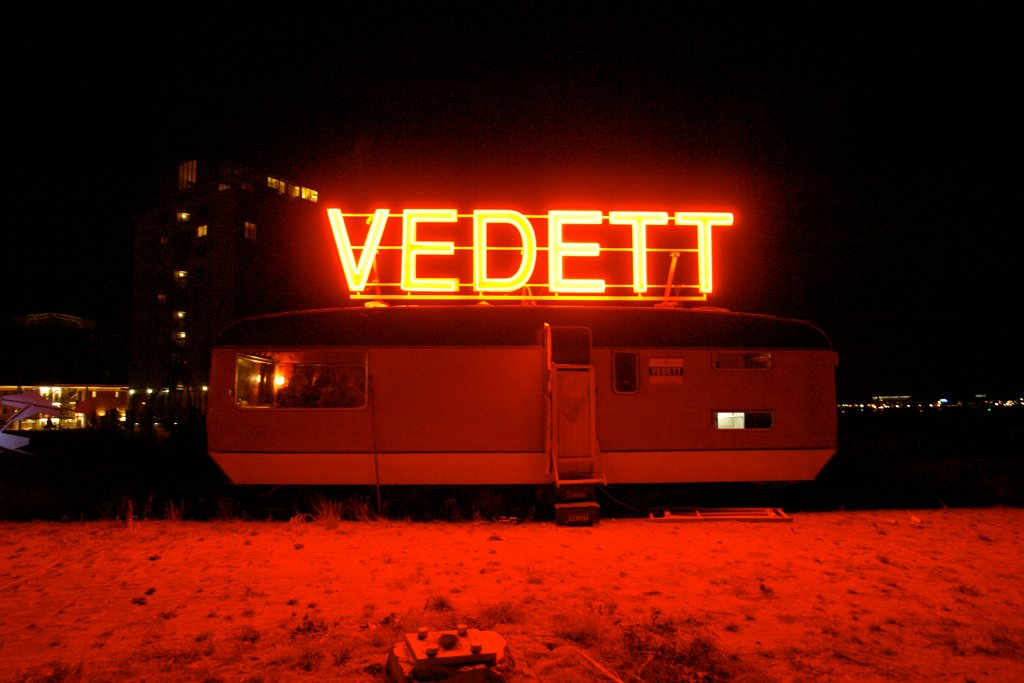
In 2009

Pluk de Nacht (pronounced [ˌplʏɡ də ˈnɑxt]) is an Open Air Film Festival based in Amsterdam. Every summer the Open Air Film Festival Amsterdam presents a selection of unreleased independent arthouse cinema, documentary, animation and shorts, attracting both film enthusiasts and professionals. Films are projected in the open air on a beautiful old harbour location in the centre of Amsterdam. Admission to all festival activities and screenings is free.

The Open Air Film Festival Amsterdam was founded in 2003 by a group of young film professionals. Dissatisfied by seeing wonderful works of cinematic art not being picked up by Dutch distributors and cinemas, they started a film festival aimed at finding new audiences for these films.

== History ==
=== 2003 ===
The first edition of the festival started on Friday the 15th of August. During eight days the following films were screened:

- A Cold Summer (Paul Middleditch)
- Verboden te Zuchten (Alex Stockman)
- Jesus' Son (Alison Maclean)
- Plus-minus Null (Eoin Moore)
- Durval Discos (Anna Muylaert)

=== 2004 ===
The second edition took place from 5 till the 29th of August 2004. The following films were screened:

- Dandelion (Mark Milgard)
- Aaltra (Benoît Delépine)
- Cinemania (Angela Christlieb)
- Time Code (Mike Figgis)
- Four Shades of Brown (Tomas Alfredson)
- Prey for Rock & Roll (Alex Steyermark)
- Böse Zellen (Barbara Albert)
- Struggle (Ruth Mader)
- Lift (Marc Isaacs)

=== 2005 ===
The third edition of the festival started on 25 August 2005. During 11 days the following films were screened:

- Waar is mijn jas? / nou, dat was het dan (Dick Rijneke)
- Dead Man's Shoes (Shane Meadows)
- Last life in the universe (Pen-ek Ratanaruang)
- Ronda Nocturna (Edgardo Cozarinsky)
- Fred (Wilbert Bank)
- Die souvenirs des herrn X (Arash T. Riahi)
- Midwinter's Night Dream (Goran Paskaljevic)
