= Jeevan Job Thomas =

Indian writer

- ജീവൻ ജോബ് തോമസ്
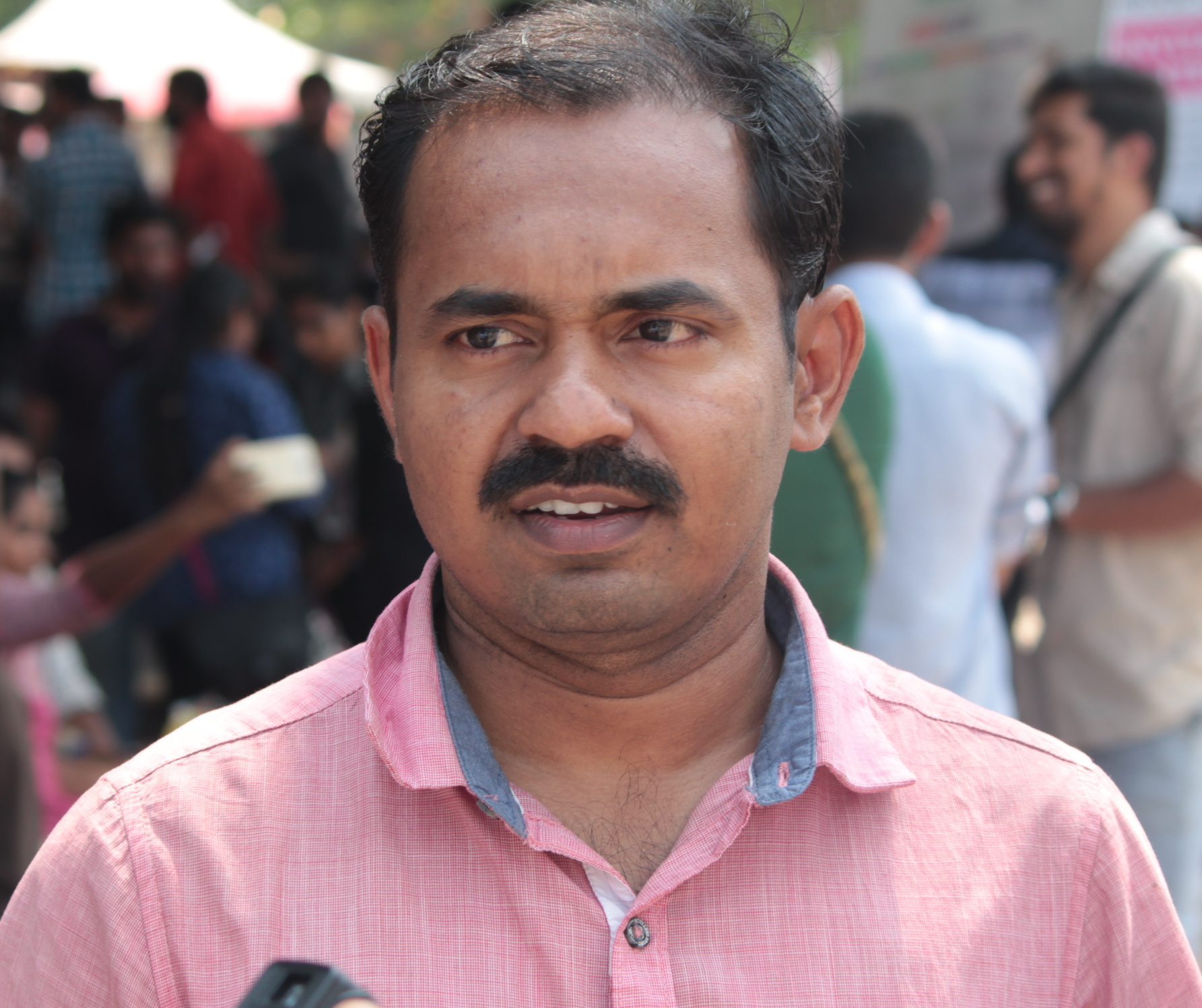
- Born: 20 October 1979 (age 46); Vengola, Kerala, India
- Education: Mahatma Gandhi University, Kerala
- Occupations: Writer; novelist; screenplay writer
- Writing career
- Language: Malayalam
- Genre: Thriller
- Subject: Science

Jeevan Job Thomas (born October 20, 1979) is an Indian essayist, novelist, and screenwriter known for his contributions in Malayalam.

== Early life ==
Jeevan Job Thomas was born on 20 October 1979 at Vengola village in the Ernakulam district of Kerala. He obtained a doctorate in physics from the School of Pure and Applied Physics, Mahatma Gandhi University, Kerala, Kottayam, with a dissertation focused on nanomagnetism and ferrite nanostructures. After finishing PhD, he worked as a Ad hoc faculty at National Institute of Technology Calicut.

== Literary career ==
Thomas has written essays for Malayalam magazines since 2006. In 2013, he published the book Rathi Rahasyam—an in depth study on human sexuality which interconnects the knowledge on sexuality with anthropology, evolutionary psychology, and cultural history. His first novel, Nidra Moshanam, is a psychological thriller published in 2015. The nonfiction book Maranathinte Ayiram Mukhangal (2016) explores ideas of death from cell death to the end of human civilization by converging political history, cultural philosophy, cellular biology, and evolutionary theory. In 2014, based on the murder of an old lady in Kozhikode, he penned an article about how the legal system made an innocent youth a criminal. Movie director Madhupal read the article and asked Jeevan Job Thomas to pen a screenplay based on it. The movie, Oru Kuprasidha Payyan, was released in 2018 to rave reviews with special mention to the screenplay. The second novel Theneecharani is a narrative experiment intertwines the lives of three distinct women by reconciling sexuality, envy and power structure rooted in different myths of Malabar region.

== Works ==
- Viswasathinte Sareerasasthram (collection of essays)
- Parinama Sidhantham-Puthiya Vazhikal Kandethalukal (collection of essays)
- Prapanchavum Manushyanum Thammilenthu (collection of essays)
- Rathi Rahasyam
- Nidra Moshanam (novel)
- Maranathinte Aayiram Mughangal
- Oru Kuprasidha Payyan (screenplay)
- Theneecharani (novel)
- Sargonmadham (collection of essays)

== Awards ==
- Kerala Science Literature Awards for Science Journalism (2014) by Kerala State Council for Science, Technology and Environment
- Prof. Joseph Mundassery award for young writer 2015.
- Dr. C. P. Menon Memorial Award for Science Writing 2015.
