= Anbessa =

2019 film by Mo Scarpelli

- Directed by: Mo Scarpelli
- Written by: Mo Scarpelli
- Release dates: February 9, 2019
- Running time: +85 minutes
- Countries: Italy, United States, Ethiopia
- Language: Amharic

Anbessa, is a 2019 documentary directed by Mo Scarpelli that premiered at the Berlin International Film Festival. The film tells a coming-of-age narrative around ten-year-old Asalif, displaced from his farmland near Addis Ababa due to condominium construction. As the city evolves, the film captures Asalif's imaginative resistance, where he transforms into a lion ("anbessa" in Amharic) to combat external threats and navigate a changing world. Anbessa explores the clash between tradition and modernity, prompting viewers to reflect on the true costs of progress. The film received critical acclaim, winning awards at various festivals, and serves as a catalyst for discussions on sustainable development, cultural preservation, and the human impact of societal transformations. As Asalif grapples with his lion persona and the realities of change, Anbessa invites audiences to reconsider prevailing narratives surrounding development and emphasizes the importance of preserving cultural identity amidst relentless modernization.
