= Midwest Ski Film Festival =

Film festival in Milwaukee, Wisconsin

- Genre: Newschool Skiing
- Date: October
- Locations: Milwaukee, WI
- Years active: 3
- Founded: 2008
- Website: https://www.facebook.com/MWSFF

The Midwest Ski Film Festival (MWSFF) is a Film Festival takes place annually in Milwaukee, Wisconsin. Held in October, the festival is a showcase for ski films from both independent and professional ski film companies. The festival shows mainly newschool skiing films.

== History ==
The Midwest Ski Film Festival is held annually in Milwaukee, Wisconsin and Minneapolis, Minnesota. It was created to fill a void of Freeskiing film festivals. The MWSFF is attended by people from all over the country, including industry professionals and professional skiers.

=== 2008 event ===
In 2008 the event was held on October 4, at the Helene Zelazo center on the University of Wisconsin–Milwaukee campus.It featured the movies Turbo by Level 1 Productions, The Massive by Tanner Hall and Redbull, Slamina by 4bi9 productions, Reasons by Poorboyz Productions, Such is Life by Rage Productions, Head for the Hills by Meathead Productions, and Thinking out Loud by B-Film Media.

Free products from sponsors were given away, including skis, goggles, hats, gloves, shirts, stickers, energy drinks, etc. An after party was held at the Thirdward headquarters to show the movies FTW (Fun Times in Wisconsin) by BP Media, and Hunting Yeti by Nimbus Productions.

=== 2009 event ===
2009 MWSFF Poster

The 2009 event was held on October 10, at the Mirmar Theater near the [University of Wisconsin–Milwaukee] campus. People came in from all over the Midwest including Minnesota, Michigan, Indiana, and more.

The films shown were Refresh by Level 1 Productions, Every Day is a Saturday by Poorboyz Productions, So Far So Hood by 4bi9 Media, NICE a Minnesota collaborative movie, and Newschoolers.com contest winner Let's Dance by Jibulant Productions. Sponsors of the 2009 MWSFF were Jiberish Clothing, and Scion. The after party was thrown at the Thirdward, LLC Headquarters and, like the film festival, featured the musical stylings of Hathbanger and Daywalker.
