= Christine Fetzer =

American bodybuilder, model and wrestler

- Born: 1969 (age 55–56); United States
- Occupation(s): Bodybuilder, model, wrestler

Christine Fetzer (born 1969) is an American bodybuilder, model and wrestler. Fetzer is sometimes known professionally as Christine Rocks.

Fetzer has won several body building competitions, including her first, the 1995 Virginia Classic (Woman's Heavyweight division). Since then she has appeared in body building magazines such as Flex, Ironman, Natural Bodybuilding Magazine and Woman's Physique World.

Christine was the subject of the 2001 documentary film Highway Amazon directed by Ronnie Cramer. The film showed Fetzer traveling the country wrestling men in hotel rooms (muscle worship).
