= Denver Underground Film Festival =

- Location: Denver, Colorado, U.S.

The Denver Underground Film Festival (DUFF) premiered November 21–23, 1997 at The Bug Theater in Denver, Colorado. Since then the visions of hundreds of independent filmmakers from around the world have been showcased, including films by classic experimental and avant-garde filmmakers like Stan Brakhage, Luis Buñuel, Fassbinder, and Man Ray.
