= Miami Short Film Festival =

The Miami Short Film Festival is an annual film festival held in Miami, Florida, United States. The festival was established in 2002 by William Vela, and takes place around the second and third week of November. It was created to make a connection between established studios, independent filmmakers, and the global creative community, as well as to honor excellence in the art of filmmaking.

The festival presents awards for:

- Best of Fest
- Best Foreign Film
- Best Animation
- Best Experimental
- Best Documentary
- Best Narrative
- Best Environmental
- Best Local
