= Cape Cod International Film Festival =

Annual film festival in Massachusetts, US

- Location: Chatham, Massachusetts, United States
- Founded: 2014
- Festival date: October 10th - 18th
- Language: International
- Website: prectra.wixsite.com/capecodiff

The Cape Cod International Film Festival (CCIFF) is an annual film festival held in Chatham, Massachusetts, and Orleans, Massachusetts. Established in 2014, the event screens short and feature films at the Orpheum Theater and the Main Street Wine and Gourmet screening loft. Official selections are announced in August for the October event.

== History ==
The CCIFF was founded in 2014 by Cape Cod resident, Phil Rectra. The inaugural event was held from October 10–18, 2015, and included 26 films selected from 330 submissions. The majority of films were submitted via FilmFreeway and Withoutabox online platforms.

The 2015 program featured 26 films, including the international selection Eadweard and the animated short We Can't Live Without Cosmos; the latter subsequently received a nomination for the Academy Award for Best Animated Short Film.

== Awards ==
In 2015, the festival's Best Picture award was given to Eadweard, and Charlotte Schioler received Best Director for SLØR. Xander Berkeley was recognized for his performance in PONY.
