= Milwaukee Short Film Festival =

The Milwaukee Short Film Festival is an annual film festival held in Milwaukee, Wisconsin.

== History ==
The festival was established in 1994 by the Milwaukee Independent Film Society and is held each year in September. In 2015, the festival screened 53 short films at ComedySportz in Walker's Point, Milwaukee. Thirty-six of the films were works by local filmmakers.
