= List of film festivals in India =

This is a list of film festivals in India.

== A ==
- Ahmedabad International Film Festival
- Alpavirama South Asian Short and Documentary Film Festival

== B ==
- Bangalore Queer Film Festival
- Best Film First
- Bioscope Global Film Festival
- Bodhisattava International Film Festival
- Bollywood International Film Festival
- Brahmaputra Valley Film Festival
- Bring Your Own Film Festival
- Bengaluru International Film Festival

== C ==
- Chambal International Film Festival, Kota
- Chennai International Film Festival
- Chennai International Queer Film Festival
- Cinemela Film Festival

== D ==
- Darbhanga International Film Festival
- Development Film Festival
- Dharamshala International Film Festival
- Dehradun International Film Festival

== F ==
- Filmsaaz
- Flashpoint Human Rights Film Festival

== G ==
- The Great Indian Film and Literature Festival
- The Golden Elephant
- Golden Jury Film Festival
- Guwahati International Film Festival

== H ==
- Hyderabad Bengali Film Festival
- Hyderabad International Film Festival

== I ==
- International Film Festival of India
- India Film Project
- International Film Festival of Kerala

== J ==
- Jagran Film Festival
- Jaipur International Film Festival
- Jeevika Film Festival
- Jeevika: Asia Livelihood Documentary Festival

== K ==
- Kashmir World Film Festival
- Kalakari Film Festival
- KASHISH Pride Film Festival
- Kolkata International Film Festival
- Karnataka Youth International Short Film Festival

== L ==
- Ladakh International Film Festival

== M ==
- Madhubani Film Festival
- MAMI Mumbai Film Festival
- Manikarnika International Film Festival
- Mumbai International Film Festival
- Mumbai Women's International Film Festival
- Mumbai Indiefilm Festival

== N ==
- National Children's Film Festival
- National Science Film Festival and Competition

== O ==
- Osian's Cinefan Festival of Asian and Arab Cinema

== P ==
- Patna Film Festival
- Pondicherry International Film Festival
- Pune International Film Festival

== R ==
- Rajasthan Film Festival

== S ==
- SiGNS Film Festival
- Syne International Film Festival

== T ==
- Tigerland India Film Festival
- Thrissur International Film Festival

== V ==
- VadFest
- Verite Film Festival (Kashmir)
- ViBGYOR Film Festival

== See also ==
- by. "Top Indian Film Festivals in the World | List of Film Festivals in India - National Film Awards".
