= Habaspuri sari =

Saree

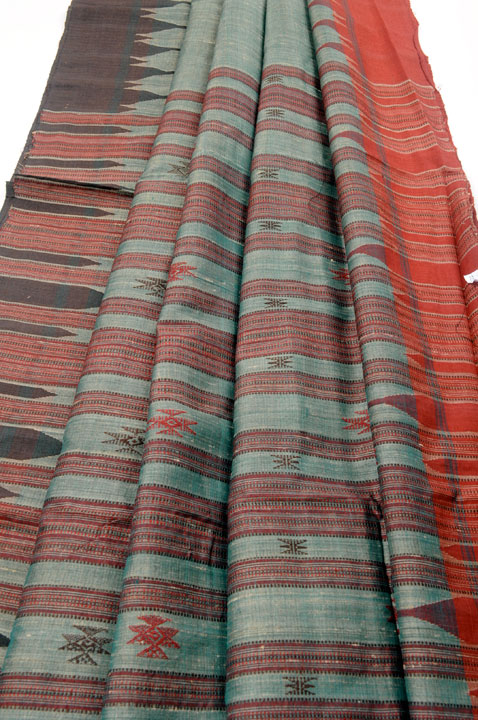
A Habaspuri sari.

Habaspuri(Odia pronunciation: [habɔsɔpuɾi]) is a cotton-based traditional handloom textile of Odisha, India. The Habaspuri sari is a major handloom sari product of this textile. The Bhulia weavers of Chicheguda, Kalahandi district, Odisha are originally attributed for weaving of the Habaspuri fabric. For its uniqueness in weaving, design and production, it has been identified as one of the 14 Geographical Indications of Odisha.

== Etymology ==
The Habaspuri handloom is named after the village of Habaspur in Kalahandi district where it was originally woven by the Kandha Tribe during the nineteenth century. When dynastic rule ended, tribal people stopped making saris but the sari was revived by a weaver, Ugrasen Meher, in Chicheguda.

== Fabric and design ==
This traditional fabric is famous for tie-dye technique and motifs. Mostly made in cotton and silk, ethnic motifs like kumbha (temple), fish, flowers, turtle and tribal wall art of the region on the sarees makes it even more unique in the textile business of the state.

== Development ==
According to the reports of Textile and Handloom Department, in 2018-19 the production value of Habaspuri Sarees and fabrics went down, the number of weavers also decreased because of poor returns as compared to the labour-intensive and time-consuming work. When the handloom was on the verge of declination, fashion designer Sujit Meher, born in Chicheguda took the initiative to revive his homeland handloom.

== Production and sales ==
The Habaspuri saris and other textile products produced by the individual weavers and groups are marketed and sold by the Textiles and Handlooms Department of the Government of Odisha in the government-run stores.

== Documentary ==
In November 2023, acclaimed Indian writer-director Biswanath Rath's feature documentary project proposal 'Habaspuri Weaving: The Second and Last Death???' got selected in NFDC Film Bazaar Documentary Co-Production Market and was pitched in Film Bazaar Goa held between 20-24 November 2023. This documentary is the spiritual successor to Biswanath's acclaimed handloom documentary 'Kotpad Weaving' (on Kotpad Handloom fabrics) and aspires to explore the uniqueness of Habaspuri handloom as well as the issues and challenges faced by Habaspuri weavers from Kalahandi district (Odisha). This documentary proposal featured in the list of 12 documentaries selected by NFDC team (for co-production market) out of 98 international entries. The documentary is scheduled to go on floor in October 2024.

As part of the National Handloom Day 2026 celebrations, on 7th August 2026, Ritupriya Productions (in association with BnR Films and MNM Entertainment) unveiled the Official Poster of Biswanath's Odia documentary “Habaspuri Weaving: The Second and Last Death ???”.
