= Gobardhan Panika =

Traditional tribal handloom weaver

- Born: Kotpad, Koraput district, Odisha, India
- Occupation: Weaver
- Spouse: Jemamani Panika
- Awards: Padma Shri; Sant Kabir Award; National Award

Gobardhan Panika is an Indian master weaver of Kotpad handloom a traditional tribal craft. The Government of India awarded him the fourth highest civilian honour of the Padma Shri, in 2018, for his contributions to the art of weaving.

== Biography ==
Gobardhan Panika was born in a small village called Kotpad, Koraput district, Odisha, India. He was 12-year-old when he left school and took up the family business of weaving. He married Jema Panika who won a National Award in 2009 for ethnic handloom products.

His hand-woven textiles have tribal motifs that are geometrical, also drawn from nature - tortoises, crabs, birds flowers, animals, fish, pyramids. Panika weaves saree, shawl, towel and other products which are 100% cotton with natural thread fibers.

Process of weaving starts with a hand spun cotton yarn from the Handloom Society which is then treated with a month-long dyeing process even before being made a fabric. The dyes are extracts of the Aaljhaad(Indian Madder) tree barks. Only two primary shades are used - textured red and coffee brown. The process involves soaking the yarn in oil, mixing with cow dung for disinfecting, washing in a running stream, boiling it 40 times for seasoning and roughening for a coarse feel. The barks are separately taken out in flakes for powdering in a refined process that gets mixed and boiled with the yarn. It would take a week to weave a dupatta, and a month for a saree.

The red colour comes from the roots of the aal tree (Indian Madder). Shades of red, maroon and dark brown can be obtained depending on the ageing of the madder and the way the dye is processed (under the sun, in clay pots). Black is developed by adding powdered kumhar-pathar (sulphate of iron; they buy it from blacksmiths).

== Awards ==
- Gobardhan Panika received National Award-2004 from the former President of India, late APJ Abdul Kalam on 12 December 2005 for his contribution in preserving, promoting and enriching the traditional and cultural heritage of the country through the unique art-forms of crafting and weaving.
- Panika received Sant Kabir Award - 2013 from the Prime Minister Narendra Modi on 7 August 2015 for the `Tribal Bagchura Chunni at the launch of National handloom day.
- He was conferred the Padma Shri by the Government of India in 2018. Gobardhan Panika received Padma award from the President of India, Ram Nath Kovind on 30 March 2018 in Art-Weaving category.

== Media ==
Gobardhan Panika has been featured in English Documentary Kotpad Weaving : The Story of a Race Against Time, directed by Biswanath Rath. This documentary explores the uniqueness of Kotpad Handloom, the issues and possible solutions for revival of Kotpad Weaving and Dyeing.

The documentary was telecasted on DD National on 24 March 2018.

== See also ==
- Handloom
