= Padmini Dian =

Member of the Odisha Legislative Assembly

Minister for Textiles, Handlooms & Handicrafts
- Constituency: Kotpad

Personal details
- Born: 1 July 1986 (age 39)
- Party: Biju Janata Dal
- Spouse: Shri Sadasiv Dian

Padmini Dian is an Indian politician. She was elected to the Odisha Vidhan Sabha (Odisha Legislative Assembly) from Kotpad constituency, Odisha, in the 2019 Indian general election as a member of the Biju Janata Dal. She is currently serving in the Odisha Legislative Assembly as Minister for Textiles, Handlooms & Handicrafts.

In a close-fought election in 2019, Padmini Dian emerged as the winner in the Kotpad constituency by defeating the incumbent MLA Chandra Sekhar Majhi of INC by 2,500 votes.

It was a moment of pride for the people of Kotpad when Padmini Dian was elected to office. She was seen as the hope of hundreds of local handloom weavers whose art form is about to vanish, as documented by Biswanath Rath in his film Kotpad Weaving: The Story of a Race Against Time.

== Biography ==
Padmini Dian hails from a small village near Kotpad named Dhamanahandi. She studied till matriculation and she is a farmer by profession. She is an active minister in the Odisha State Assembly. She launched a book on local hand weaving called Divine Fabric in February 2020.

She is known for her social work and being close to the masses. She has arranged numerous plantation workshops and blood donation camps and is an active member of many self-help groups.

== See also ==
- Kotpad Handloom fabrics
