= Kotpad Assembly constituency =

Constituency of the Odisha legislative assembly in India

Coordinates: 19.14°N 82.32°E

Kotpad
- Constituency No. 142 for the Odisha Legislative Assembly

Constituency details
- Country: India
- Region: East India
- State: Odisha
- Division: Southern Division
- District: Koraput
- Lok Sabha constituency: Nabarangpur
- Established: 1961
- Total electors: 2,09,003 (Note: as on 2024) (Note: as data published by election commission)
- Reservation: ST

Member of Legislative Assembly
- 17th Odisha Legislative Assembly
- Incumbent Rupu Bhatra
- Party: Bharatiya Janata Party
- Elected year: 2024

Kotpad is a Vidhan Sabha constituency of Koraput district, Odisha.

This constituency includes Kotpad, Kotpad block, Kundra block, 11 Gram panchayats (Dengapadar, Aunli, Malda, Sanparia, Jujhari, Kamara, Pondasguda, Sosahandi, Kanagam, Anchala and Bijapur) of Borigumma block and 7 Gram panchayats (Gupteswar, Ramagiri, Dandabadi, Baligam, Kathapada, Majhiguda and Tentuliguma) of Boipariguda block.

== Elected members ==
Vote share of winning candidates
2024	42.13%
2019	37.1%
2014	37.40%
2009	37.40%
2004	47.13%
2000	61.47%
1995	69.37%
1990	45.41%
1985	72.80%
1980	69.47%
1977	66.49%

Since its formation in 1961, 15 elections were held till date.

List of members elected from Kotpad constituency are:

Year	Member	Party
2024	Rupu Bhatra	Bharatiya Janata Party
2019	Padmini Dian	Biju Janata Dal
2014	Chandra Sekhar Majhi	Indian National Congress
2009	Basudev Majhi	Indian National Congress
2004	Basudev Majhi	Indian National Congress
2000	Basudev Majhi	Indian National Congress
1995	Basudev Majhi	Indian National Congress
1990	Sadan Naik	Janata Dal
1985	Basudev Majhi	Indian National Congress
1980	Basudev Majhi	Indian National Congress (I)
1977	Basudev Majhi	Indian National Congress
1974	Basudev Majhi	Indian National Congress
1971	Dhansai Rondhari	Swatantra Party
1967	Surjya Narayan Majhi	Indian National Congress
1961	Mahadev Bakria	Indian National Congress

== Election results ==
=== 2024 ===
Voting were held on 13 May 2024 in 1st phase of Odisha Assembly Election & 4th phase of Indian General Election. Counting of votes was on 4 June 2024. In 2024 election, Bharatiya Janata Party candidate Rupu Bhatra defeated Biju Janata Dal candidate Chandra Sekhar Majhi by a margin of 26,264 votes.

2024 Odisha Vidhan Sabha Election: Kotpad
Party	Candidate	Votes	%	±%
BJP	Rupu Bhatra	75,275	42.13	▲21.05
BJD	Chandra Sekhar Majhi	49,011	27.43	▼9.67
INC	Anamu Dian	44,840	25.10	▼9.93
NOTA	None of the above	3,314	1.85	▼0.27
Majority		26,264	14.70	▲13.13
Turnout		1,78,656	85.48	▲3.26
BJP gain from BJD				

=== 2019 ===
In 2019 election, Biju Janata Dal candidate Padmini Dian defeated Indian National Congress candidate Chandra Sekhar Majhi by a margin of 2,631 votes.

2019 Odisha Vidhan Sabha Election: Kotpad
Party	Candidate	Votes	%	±%
BJD	Padmini Dian	62,248	37.1	−
INC	Chandra Sekhar Majhi	59,617	35.53	−
BJP	Khageshwar Pujari	35,366	21.08	−
NOTA	None of the above	3,564	2.12	−
Majority		2,631	1.57	−
Turnout		167786	82.22	−
BJD gain from INC				

=== 2014 ===
In 2014 election, Indian National Congress candidate Chandra Sekhar Majhi defeated Biju Janata Dal candidate Ashok Kumar Pangi by a margin of 31,321 votes.

2014 Odisha Vidhan Sabha Election: Kotpad
Party	Candidate	Votes	%	±%
INC	Chandra Sekhar Majhi	71,018	48.08	−
BJD	Ashok Kumar Pangi	39,697	26.88	−
BJP	Padmanav Majhi	20,699	14.01	−
NOTA	None of the above	4,863	3.29	−
Majority		31,321	21.2	−
Turnout		1,47,701	81.8	−
INC hold				

=== 2009 ===
In 2009 election, Indian National Congress candidate Basudev Majhi defeated Biju Janata Dal candidate Gopi Nath Nayak by a margin of 11,234 votes.

2009 Odisha Vidhan Sabha Election: Kotpad
Party	Candidate	Votes	%	±%
INC	Basudev Majhi	45,603	37.40	−
BJD	Gopi Nath Nayak	34,369	28.19	−
BJP	Padmanav Majhi	20,442	16.77	−
Majority		11,234	9.21 (Note: % of total valid votes)	−
Turnout		1,21,930	73.31 (Note: 2004 Voter turnout was 71.92%)	▲1.39
INC hold				
