= Akanksha Damini Joshi =

Indian filmmaker

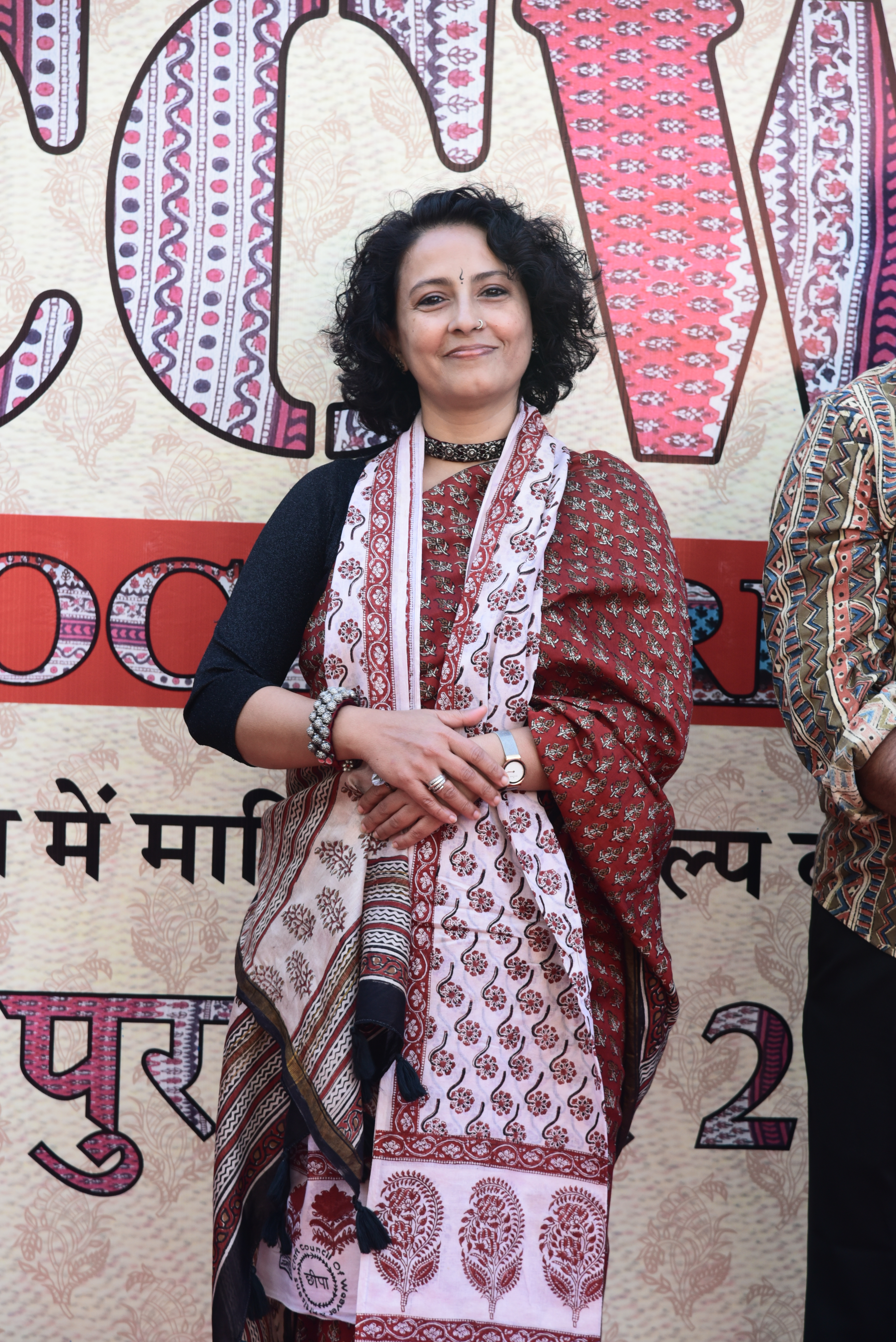
- Damini Joshi at the first Crafts Council of Weavers and Artisans Awards 2022
- Born: 27 September 1976 (age 50); Hyderabad, India
- Occupations: Filmmaker, cinematographer, photographer, meditation facilitator
- Years active: 2001–present
- Notable work: Chilika Bank$, Earth Witness, Hindu Nectar
- Website: www.daminijosh.in

Akanksha Damini Joshi is an Indian filmmaker, cinematographer, photographer and a meditation facilitator. She is also the co-founder of Center for Embodied Knowledge (CEK), a nonprofit foundation established to safeguard, protect, and promote the non-textual civilizational heritage of India.

== Career ==
Joshi has made films on a range of topics: communal conflict, ecological crisis and spiritual philosophy. Her career began with documenting conflicts of Gujarat 2002 – Passengers: A Video Journey in Gujarat. Then she took four years to make a film on ecological changes on the banks of Chilika Lake in Odisha (formerly known as Orissa) (Chilika Bank$: Stories from India's largest Coastal Lake). She then made her film on climate change – Earth Witness: Reflections on the times and the timeless. In 2014, Joshi made a film on Hindu philosophy – Hindu Nectar: Spiritual Wanderings in India, inspired by Dr. Sarvepalli Radhakrishnan's work, for the Ministry of External Affairs, Government of India. Joshi's short film on the river Ganga – Ganga: Ek Prarthana, 2007 addresses the global issue of climate change through culture-specific symbolism.

== Filmography ==
=== Passengers (2003) ===
Joshi co-directed this feature-length documentary during and after the 2002 Gujarat riots. The film, completed in 2003, has been screened at the 9th Open Frame Festival.

Five years later, Joshi came out with Profiles of Courage and Compassion, a book she co-authored with Indian activist, Harsh Mander titled, Towards Healing: Seeking Paths for Justice and Reconciliation in Gujarat.

=== Chilika Bank$ (2008) ===
Joshi's first independent directorial debut came in 2008 with Chilika Bank$, in which she covers over four decades of ecological crisis in Chilika, Asia's largest Brackish water lake. The film produced by Public Service Broadcasting Trust won the Livelihood Award at the CMS Vatavaran Environment and Wildlife Film Festival, New Delhi in 2009. It was recipient of the First Prize at 6th Jeevika: Asia Livelihood Documentary Festival.

For highlighting the issues surrounding Chilika, Joshi was awarded the Karamveer Puruskaar, National Award for Social Justice and Citizen Action by the confederation of NGOs, iCONGO, in partnership with United Nations. Chilika Bank$ was screened in the Indian Panorama section of the 40th International Film Festival of India, Goa 2009 in the non-feature film category. The film was an Official Selection at the Film South Asia, Kathmandu in 2009, the Rodos EcoFilms International Festival, Greece in 2010 and the 4th Samsung Women's International Film Festival, Chennai in 2011.

=== Earth Witness (2011) ===
Joshi's documentary on climate change, Earth Witness, reflects on climate change through the narratives of representative tribes of four different ecosystems in 2011. The film has been featured in the book on the independent documentary movement in India, Filming Reality: The Independent Documentary Movement in India by Shoma A. Chatterji. The book analyses notable documentaries made over the last four decades, including those by iconic film-makers such as Satyajit Ray, Mani Kaul and Anand Patwardhan.

The film won Best Film on Climate Change & Sustainable Technologies and the Best Cinematography awards at the Sixth CMS Vatavaran Environment and Wildlife Film Festival 2011. It was officially nominated for the Wildscreen Panda Award 2012, Wildscreen Panda Film Festival, Bristol. It was one of the three winners at the VIII Developmental Film Festival on Climate Change and Food Security, Dhan Foundation, Madurai.

=== Hindu Nectar (2014) ===
Joshi's film on spiritual seekers – Hindu Nectar is produced by the Ministry of External Affairs, India. Joshi was awarded with the Best Director award at the International Film Festival of Prayag. Hindu Nectar has been screened at the International Festival of Yog, Culture and Spirituality, Haridwar and at the 14th Open Frame Film Festival.
