= Jeevika: Asia Livelihood Documentary Festival =

Jeevika: Asia Livelihood Documentary Festival is an annual documentary festival started in January 2004 by Centre for Civil Society. The festival is a part of their Jeevika Campaign which advocates for livelihood freedom for street entrepreneurs. The festival showcases documentaries based on the issue of livelihood, to capture the challenges faced by the rural and urban poor by bringing them to the attention of the public.

== Organiser ==
Centre for Civil Society (CCS) is an independent, non-profit, research and advocacy organisation and a public policy think tank. CCS's search for truth has taken everyday cases of harassment caused by legal and regulatory restrictions as well as bureaucratic process of approvals and licences. The films provoke, arouse curiosities and shake many accepted notions.

Organised by CCS, over the years, Jeevika has screened films advocating the cause of numerous small entrepreneurs, self-employed — rickshaw pullers, street vendors, sex-workers, child labourers, farmers — and forest-dwellers.

Manoj Mathew was instrumental in scaling the festival. He was Festival Director for the year 2008, 2009, 2010, 2011, 2012, 2013, 2015 editions.

== Origin ==
CCS initiated the festival as part of its aim to create policy change, to complement their research and advocacy work.

Jeevika Festival is structured on two categories- Professional film makers and student film makers. There is a two-tier evaluation process for the competition. The Screening Committee short-lists the top 15-20 films. The Jury selects the top three winners and the Best Student Film from the shortlisted films.

== History ==
=== 1st Jeevika: National Livelihood Documentary Festival 2003-04 ===
Jeevika 2003-04 was organized on January 17–18, 2004 at India Habitat Centre, New Delhi. Nine documentaries were screened at Jeevika 2003. The festival was inaugurated by film actress Nandita Das. The festival showcased documentary films on issues from struggles and aspirations of sex workers to Punjab farmers lured by money power taking the dangerous and illegal road to a better life abroad.

=== 2nd Jeevika: National Livelihood Documentary Festival 2004-05 ===
Jeevika 2004-05 received 69 entries from students and professional filmmakers from all over India. 29 were student productions. 15 of these were screened at the India Habitat Center Festival in January 2005.Rahul Bose was inaugurated Jeevika 2004. Award ceremony was held on January 29, 2005 with inaugural address of Sanjaya Baru and award presentation by the chief guest Deepti Naval.Madhu Kishwar was also present to release the CCS Publication ‘Law, Liberty & Livelihood’. Jeevika 2004 was supported by Sir Ratan Tata Trust & John Templeton Foundation. Event partners were Red FM, The Indian Express, India Habitat Center.

=== 3rd Jeevika: National Livelihood Documentary Festival 2005-06 ===
This was held at India Habitat Centre from January 21 to 28 2006 as well as at Kamala Nehru College. 85 entries were received from student and professional film-makers in various countries including India, Pakistan, Sri Lanka, Nepal, Bangladesh and Serbia of which 34 were student entries. The festival screened Lalitha Krishnan's ‘Sea City’, ‘Refugee of War’ by M.W. Geethani Senavirathna, ‘Pretty Dyana’ by Boris Mitic, ‘Treacling Down’ by Upali Gamlath and ‘Of Hawks and Hawkers’ by Shankar S. Shown on the second day were ‘A Page from the Red Data Book’ by Saurav Dey, ‘Life on Four Wheels’ by Anshuman Jha, ‘In Search of the Job’ by Mrinal Talukdar and ‘Lakshmi and Vishwakarma’ by Vasudha Joshi. The festival closed with the screening of "One Show Less" by Nayantara C. Kotian, which also won the first prize at the festival.

=== 4th Jeevika: South Asia Livelihood Documentary Festival 2007 ===
In association with Youth Parliament, the festival was held from July 20–23, 2007 at the India Habitat Centre, Delhi. Screenings were also held across various colleges, institutes and schools across Delhi from July 23-August 23, for public viewing. Festival received 40 entries from students and 88 from professional filmmakers.

Smt. Shiela Dikshit (Former Chief Minister, New Delhi), Mr. P Chidamabram (Former Finance Minister, GOI), Mr. Ajay Maken (President Delhi Pradesh Congress Committee), Mr. Prashant Bhushan (Supreme Court Advocate, Social Activists), Ms. Renana Jhabvala (National Coordinator, SEWA Bharat), Mr. CR Jayasinghe (Sri Lankan High Commissioner) were among the chief guests.

=== 5th Jeevika: South Asia Livelihood Documentary Festival 2008 ===
Festival was held from August 29 to August 31, 2008. Opening ceremony was dedicated to the cause of Tibetan refugees in the country. Neal Karthik's ‘Tribute to Life - memoir of a lost land.’ was screened as the opening film. The official representative of the Dalai Lama, Tempa Tsering, opened the film festival. Jury selected 17 entries out of 101 entries from Bangladesh, Pakistan, Nepal, United States, Iran and India for the screening.

=== 6th Jeevika: Asia Livelihood Documentary Festival 2009 ===
175 entries were received from professional filmmakers and students. 11 documentaries were screened at the India Habitat Centre. Manoj Mathew, Director of the Festival, said, “The panel discussion which took place after the documentary screenings were the key-point of this festival. They encouraged people to think out of the box and break stereotypes. Through these discussions some plausible solutions to the problems also emerged.” Shaji Pattanam's The Hunted - In search of Home and Hope, which won the 3rd prize highlighted the plight of tribes in Kerala, who were evicted from their natural habitat by corporate planters. One of the documentaries explored the unusual lives of the Neharwalas in Kolkata, who meticulously sweep drains in front of goldsmiths’ shops and try to distil gold from the dirt.

=== 7th Jeevika: Asia Livelihood Documentary Festival 2010 ===
Jeevika: Asia Livelihood Documentary Festival, 27–29 August 2010 at Indian Habitat Centre, New Delhi. 21 entries were selected for the three-day screening. S M Khan, Director, Director General (Press Registrar and Head of Department) opened the festival. Nandan Saxena discussed on the topic “Representation of Reality in Documentary Making”. Mr. Sharad Yadav, MP Lok Sabha and Shabana Azmi, Indian actress and social activist were among the high-profile chief guests of the festival who also gave away the prizes.

=== 8th Jeevika: Asia Livelihood Documentary Festival 2011 ===
In 2011 a total of 14 documentaries films were shortlisted from a total of 73 entries. On inaugural day noted filmmaker and Padma Vibhushan, Shri Adoor Gopalakrishnan declared the festival open and gave away the awards. Keynote Address was given by Ram Jethmalani, Lawyer and Member of Parliament.Shri Gopalakrishnan was quoted in the festival as: “I am really happy that Jeevika is giving a platform to aspiring filmmakers to show their talent, and not just that, they are also funding some of the films. One has to think about the logistics, no matter how much talent you have.”

=== 9th Jeevika: Asia Livelihood Documentary Festival 2012 ===
Held from 31 August - 2 September 2012 at the India Habitat Centre. 18 documentary (13 professionals and 5 students) films were screened during the festival. The films were based various subjects such as Mumbai's night rat killers, life of primitive tribes, sex workers, seaweed collectors. Subhash Ghai was the chief guest of the event. He addressed the audience on the importance of reforming the education system in India to bring livelihood issues to the forefront of policy reform. The festival also conducted panel discussions on the issues of livelihood and documentary & public policy.

=== 10th Jeevika: Asia Livelihood Documentary Festival 2013 ===
In 2013, the festival received entries from across Asia including Singapore, China, Nepal, Malaysia, Indonesia and Bangladesh. 38 documentaries were shortlisted for screening which included long and short films by both professional and students documentary makers CCS with the Delhi Photography Club hosted a photo exhibition and over 40 photographs will be showcased at the festival. Prominent people who came to see the documentaries were Arundhati Roy, Mr. & Mrs. Veerappa Moily who came to see documentary by their daughter Sushma Veerappa "When Shankar Nag Comes Asking."

== Supported by (notable personalities) ==
Year	Celebrities
2003-2004	Nandita Das
2004-2005	Rahul Bose, Deepti Naval., Madhu Kishwar
2005 - 2006	Swaminathan Aiyar, prominent Indian journalist and columnist, consulting editor for the Economic Times BL Joshi, Indian Politician, then Lieutenant-Governor of Delhi, presently Governor of Indian state of Uttar Pradesh since 2009 APJ Abdul Kalam, scientist and administrator, then 11th President of India Shyam Benegal, Indian director and screenwriter Kanak Dixit, Nepali publisher, editor and writer, founder of the magazine Himal Southasian. Rahul Khanna, Indian Actor BJ Panda, member Indian Parliament
2007	Smt. Shiela Dikshit (Hon Chief Minister, New Delhi), Mr. P Chidambaram (Hon Finance Minister, Government of India), Mr. Ajay Maken (then Minister of State, Urban Development, GOI), Mr. Prashant Bhushan (Supreme Court Advocate, Social Activists), Ms Renana Jhabvala (National Coordinator, SEWA Bharat), Mr. CR Jayasinghe (Sri Lankan High Commissioner)
2008	Tempa Tsering, Official representative of the Dalai Lama, Arvind Gaur, Head Asmita Theatre Group Mr. Tarun J Tejpal Editor- in- Chief and Publisher of Tehelka Dr. Amit Mitra, Padma Shree 2008 Recipient, Secretary General, Federation of Indian Chambers of Commerce & Industry (FICCI)
2009	Agatha Sangma, Minister of State, Ministry of Rural Development, Shriya Kishore, Miss India Earth2009 Gurcharan Das, Chairman of Centre for Civil Society Gargi Sen, Film Maker, Magic Lantern Foundation
2010	S M Khan, Director, Film Festivals, Ministry of Information & Broadcasting, GOI, Mr Sharad Yadav, MP – LokSabha, Chairman, Committee on Urban Development, Shabana Azmi, Actress and Social Activist, Dr Adish C Aggarwala, President of International Council of Jurist Nandan Saxena
2011	Shri Adoor Gopalakrishnan, National Award-winning filmmaker and Padma Vibhushan, Shri Ram Jethmalani, Lawyer and Member of Parliament.
2012	Subhash Ghai, Indian film director, producer and screenwriter Amir Ullah Khan, Economist & Deputy Director, Bill and Melinda Gates Foundation; Supriyo Sen & Amlan Datta, Nandan Saxena, Anasuya Vaidya, Anjan Roy, Economic Advisor, Associated Chambers of Commerce and Industry (ASSOCHAM)
2013	
2014	
2015	

== Winners ==
Years	Prize	Film Maker	Film
2003-2004	First Prize: Rs 25,000	Tales of the Night Fairies	Shohini Ghosh
	Second Prize: Rs 20,000	The city Beautiful	Rahul Roy
	Third Prize: Rs 15,000	Turf Wars	Sanjay Banrela and Vasant Saberwal
2004-2005	First Prize: Rs 45,000	Aftershocks: A Rough Guide to Democracy	Rakesh Sharma
	Second Prize: Rs. 30,000	..3.2.1.0? ...Who Can Change Me?	Biju KC
	Third Prize: Rs. 20,000	Pedal soldiers of India	Raza Haider & Kaukab
	Best Student Film: Rs. 10, 000	Zarina	Suhail Bukhari & Piyush Pushak
2005-2006	First Prize: Rs. 45,000	One Show Less	Nayantara C Kotian, Institute: NID-Ahmedabad
	Second Prize: Rs. 30,000	Fight for Survival	Dakxin Nandlal Bajarange
	Third Prize: Rs. 20,000	Treacling Down	Upali Gamlath (Sri Lanka)
	Best Student Film: Rs. 10,000	Aamchi Kasauti	Rrivu Laha (FTII, Pune)
2007- 2008	First Prize: Rs. 45, 000	Ambi Jiji's Retirement	Ms Nandini Bedi
	Second Prize: Rs. 30, 000	The Right to Survive	Ms Rita Banerji and Ms Shilpi Sharma
	Third Prize: Rs. 20, 000	Seruppu (Footwear)	RP Amudhan
	Best Student Film	Prakash Travelling Cinema, Mandai	Ms Megha Lakhani, Ms Radhika Murthy & Mr Robert Stoeger
2008 - 2009	First Prize: Rs. 50, 000	Chilika Bank$	Akanksha Joshi
	Second Prize: Rs. 35, 000	Laxmi and Me	Nishtha Jain
	Third Prize: Rs. 25, 000	Hollow Cylinder	Nandan Saxena and Kavita Bahl
	Jeevika Rotary Students Award: Rs. 10, 000	What is the point of Stories if they aren’t even true?	Aditi Banerjee
	Special Jury Award	Hearts Suspended	Meghna Damani
2009 - 2010	First Prize	Not Given	
	Second Prize	Not Given	
	Third Prize: Rs. 30,000	The Hunted-In Search of Home & Hope	Shaji Pattanam
	Best Student Film: Rs. 10,000	Rural Postal Employees	Deepika Bhardwaj
	Jury Mention	Children of the Pyre	Rajesh S Jala
	Jury Mention	When you are Sleeping	Naveen Kumar Pun
	CCS Freedom Award	1876-An Entertainment	Anasuya Vaidya
2010- 2011	First Prize: Rs. 50,000	Delhi Bound for Work	Reena Kukreja
	Second Prize: Rs. 35,000	The Nine Months	Merajur Rahman Baruah
	Third Prize: Rs. 25,000	Bhookh	Ramesh Vishwakarma
	Best Student Film: Rs. 15,000	Behind Closed Doors	Pracheta Sharma & Jessica Hopper
	Jury Mention	Dhananjay Kulkarni ‘Chandragupt’	Rrivu Laha
2011 - 2012	First Prize: Rs. 50,000	Jharu Katha	Navroze Contractor
	Second Prize: Rs. 40,000	Andhere se Pehle	Ajay T G
	Third Prize: Rs. 30,000	Koh-I-Noor	Saikat Mallick
	Best Student Film: Worth Above Rs. 20, 000	Dekha Andekhi: kaal aur kala	Akash Kamthan
	Jury Mention	Made in India	Rebacca Haimowitz & Vaishali Sinha
	Special Mention for Student Film	Budhan Diaries	K Harish Singh
	People's Choice Award	Amar	Andrew Hinton
2012 - 2013	First Prize: Rs. 60,000	I Was Born In Delhi	Bishnu Dev Halder
	Second Prize: Rs. 40,000	Shifting Undercurrents – Seaweed Collectors of Gulf of Mannar	Rita Banerji
	Third Prize: Rs. 30,000	We Are Foot Soldiers	Debolina Dutta & Oishik Sircar
	Best Student Film: Rs. 20,000	Dimond Band	Samridhi Dasot
	Special Mention	The Rat Race	Miriam Chandy Menacherry
	Special Mention	Hide Under My Sole	Shradha Jain
	Special Mention	Cycle of Life	Vishal Sharma
2015	Best Long Documentary: Rs. 50,000	Les Derniers hommes éléphants	Daniel Ferguson and Arnaud Bouquet
	Best Short Documentary: Rs. 40,000	Dancing Shoes	Rishebh Batnagar and Jogavindra S. Khera
	Best Student Film: Rs. 10,000	Sagar Manav	Tanumoy Bose
	Best Student Film: Rs. 10,000	Caste on the Menu Card	Ananyaa Gaur, Anurup Khillare, Atul Anand, Reetika Revathy Subramanian & Vaseem Chaudh
	Best CINEMATOGRAPHY: Rs. 10,000	Tyres	Kyaw Myo Lwin
	Best EDITIING: Rs. 10,000	Les Derniers hommes éléphants	Daniel Ferguson and Arnaud Bouquet
	JEEVIKA Freedom Award: Rs. 10,000	Caste on the Menu Card	Ananyaa Gaur, Anurup Khillare, Atul Anand, Reetika Revathy Subramanian & Vaseem Chaudhary

== Beyond Jeevika Festival ==
Jeevika on the road Copies of the winning films are given to educational institutes and development organisations all across South Asia by CCS. http://www.ccs.in/jeevika/index.html

Bamboo Campaign Bamboo, scientifically proven as grass, is often confused as tree or shrub or weed. Even according to India's legislation Bamboo is treated as tree and hence the protection laws are implied on it. As a result, the forest dependent communities are often restricted from using it. Although, Supreme Court has instituted laws like Scheduled Tribes and Other Traditional Forest Dwellers Act 2006 and has issued New Forest Policy 1988 to conserve forests and prevent their exploitation for commercial purposes, Bamboo is excluded from the provisions of the act.

CCS’ ‘Bamboo is not a tree’ campaign was a result of a documentary screened at the Jeevika Documentary Film Festival. They have conducted research on the issue and started online petition where they appeal to the Government of India to amend the Indian Forests Act (1927) to classify Bamboo as grass. http://jeevika.org/research/bamboo/
