= Alpavirama South Asian Short and Documentary Film Festival =

Alpavirama is a biennial film festival organised by the Department of Film and Video Communication at the National Institute of Design, Ahmedabad, India. The first edition of the festival was held in 2011 as a South Asian Short and Documentary Film Festival. Its subsequent editions, held in 2014, 2016 and 2018, retained its South Asian focus. Alpavirama 2020 was held online owing to the COVID-19 Pandemic, and it invited short fiction and documentary films by filmmakers from the Global South.

The upcoming 6th edition of Alpavirama to be held at the National Institute of Design, Ahmedabad, in November 2022 will see it evolve from a Global South festival to an International Youth Film Festival.

== 2011 ==
Alpavirama South Asian Short and Documentary Film Festival 2011, alongside its official selection of films from across South Asia, also presented a retrospective package of NID Film & Video Communication student films. Alumni whose works featured in the retrospective were present during the festival and led the pre and post-screening dialogue. The festival also included a Special Package of selected contemporary documentary and short fiction films from Hong Kong.

== 2014 ==
Alpavirama Film Festival 2014: South Asia Through the South Asian Eye, alongside its official selection of films from across South Asia, also presented an NID Film & Video Retrospective, Tribute to Film Southasia, Nepal, Tribute to Beskop Tshechu, Bhutan, a Special Package from Myanmar and included a Seminar on Writing Episodic Fiction for TV.

== 2016 ==
Alpavirama Film Festival 2016: Asia Through the Asian Eye had a pan-Asian focus, aiming to consolidate and celebrate the vibrant Asian spirit. Alongside its official selection of films from across Asia, it included the special packages of Focus on Asia, NID Film & Video Retrospective, Film South Asia, Vasakh Film Festival, Looking China, and organised a Master Class on Editing the Documentary and a Seminar titled Video on the Edge.

== 2018 ==
Alpavirama Asian Short and Documentary Film Festival 2018: Asia Through the Asian Eye retained its Asia focus. It featured an Asian Competition, a Master Class: Listening through the Lens, A Seminar: GreyScales - Elderly in the Movies, and an Exhibition : My Journey as a Witness by Shahidul Alam.

== 2020 ==
Alpavirama Online Film Festival of Very Short Films from the Global South, held in 2020, invited films from the Global South which featured Lockdown Stories in light of the COVID-19 pandemic. Alongside the selected films which were screened on a streaming platform, the fifth edition of Alpavirama also featured an Online Exhibition of Indian Railways Photographs by Apurva Bahadur, Video on the Edge: Conversations on Video in the Age of Multi-Platform Storytelling, and a Masterclass titled Lesing the city.

== 2022 ==
The upcoming edition of Alpavirama is positioned to expand it from a Global South festival to an International festival, inviting filmmakers from around the world. The 6th Alpavirama International Youth Film Festival will take place between 7–12 November 2022 at the National Institute of Design in Paldi, Ahmedabad, India.

== Awards ==
The Competition is open to short fiction and documentary films, between 5–30 minutes; produced after 1 August 2014; directed by a young person (under 30 years) who is a citizen of & ordinarily resident in any South Asian country, including Afghanistan, Bangladesh, Bhutan, India, Maldives, Myanmar, Nepal, Pakistan and Sri Lanka.

The Focus on Asia Section is open to short fiction and documentary films, between 5–30 minutes; produced after 1 August 2014; directed by a young person (under 30 years) who is a citizen of and ordinarily resident in any Asian country, other than in South Asia.

From the 2014 edition onwards, Alpavirama instituted an award in Late Prof. Satish Bahadur's (long-time Professor of Film Appreciation at FTII, Pune) name, for Lifetime Achievement in Film Teaching in South Asia.

=== Awards 2014 ===
==== Documentary ====
Award	Film title	Director
Golden Comma	Maneesha 1941	Makarand Dambhare
Silver Comma	FEICA – A Life With Cartoons	Waseem Abbas
Special Mention of the Jury	Babai	Kavita Datir, Amit Sonawane

==== Fiction ====
Award	Film title	Director
Golden Comma	The Contagious Apparitions of Dambarey Dendrite	Bibhusan Basnet, Pooja Gurung
Silver Comma	Life	Srinjay Thakur
Special Mention of the Jury	Little Hands	Rohin Raveendran

Prof. Satish Bahadur Lifetime Achievement Award for a Film Teacher from South Asia : Ms. Jeroo Mulla

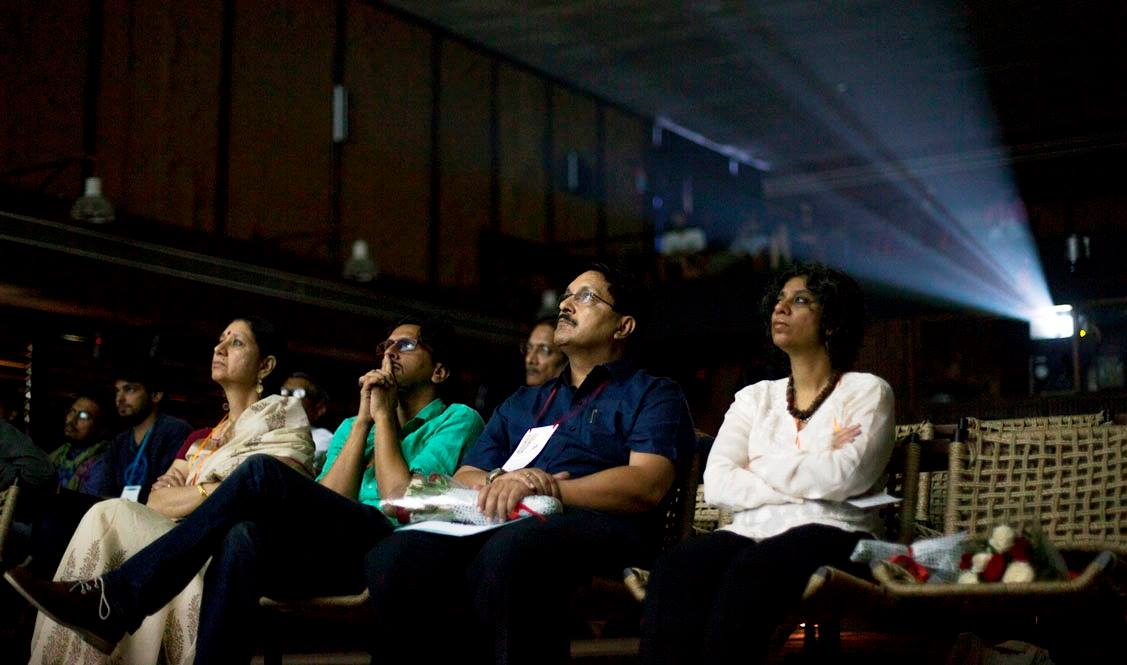
Screening (Alpavirama 2014)

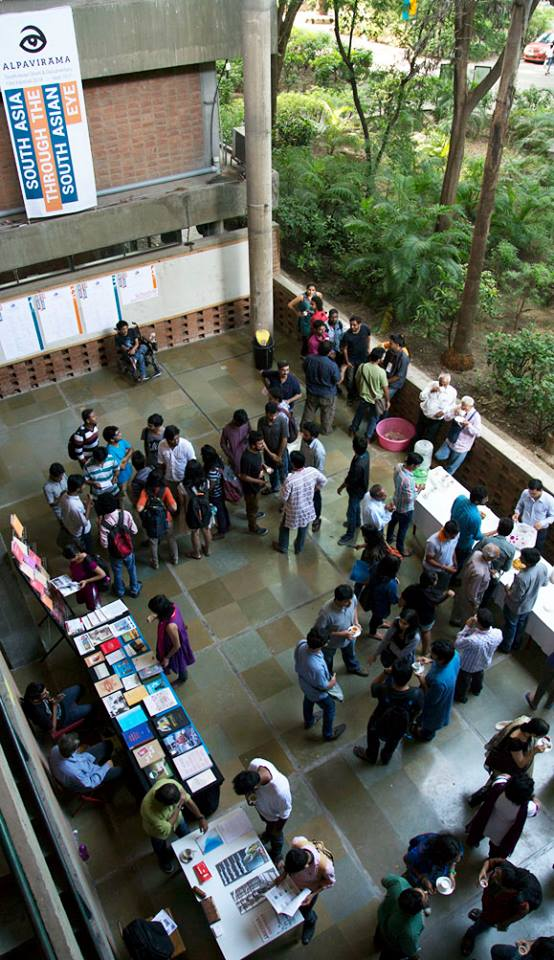
Tea Break (Alpavirama 2014)

=== Awards 2011 ===
==== Documentary ====
Award	Film title	Director
Golden Comma	Missing Vultures	Muhammad Ali Ijaz
Silver Comma	The Boxing Ladies	Anusha Nandakumar
Special Mention of the Jury	Burning Paradise	Nisar Ahmed

==== Fiction ====
Award	Film title	Director
Golden Comma	Kalu	Naveed Anjum
Silver Comma	Kusum	Shumona Banerjee
Special Mention of the Jury	Paci	J.D. Imaya Varman
Special Mention of the Jury	Shyam Raat Seher	Arunima Sharma

== See also ==
- List of film festivals in India
