= Jeevika Film Festival =

Annual film festival

Jeevika: Asia Livelihood Documentary Festival is a film festival started in January 2004 by the Centre for Civil Society, in New Delhi, India. The festival is a part of their

Jeevika Campaign which advocates for livelihood freedom for street entrepreneurs

The festival is a platform for documentaries on the issue of livelihood, to capture the challenges faced by the rural and urban poor and bring them to the attention of the public.
