= Golden Jury Film Festival =

Annual film festival in India

- Status: Active
- Genre: Film festival
- Frequency: Annually
- Locations: Mumbai, India
- Country: India
- Years active: 2019–present
- Founded: 2019
- Founder: Pragyesh Singh
- Most recent: 2023
- Next event: 2024
- Participants: Amrit Gangar, Inaamulhaq, Bidita Bag, Vikas Khanna, Karthik Krishnan, Sagar Sarhadi, Major Bikramjeet Kanwarpal, Rahul Bose, Anjali Patil, Sunil Pal, Sandeep Nath, Shishir Sharma, Vinay Pathak, Sharib Hashmi, Nitin Kakkar, Divyenndu, Saurabh Shukla, Pavan Malhotra, Gauahar Khan, Yashpal Sharma, Manoj Bakshi, J. D. Chakravarthy, Mukesh Bhatt, Barkha Bisht, Shahid Mallya, Tejaswini Kolhapure, Brijendra Kala
- Festival director: Subhransu Das
- Organiser: Golden Jury Film Academy
- Website: Official website

The Golden Jury Film Festival is a film festival in India, that is held annually in Mumbai. It was founded in 2019.

== History ==
Golden Jury Film Festival was founded by Pragyesh Singh. The first edition of the Golden Jury Film Festival was held in Mumbai, India in 2019.

== 2019 Festival ==
It was a two-day film festival that was held in Andheri, Mumbai, on 17–18 December, under the Golden Jury Film Academy's banner, whose program director was cinematographer Shubhranshu Das. The film festival had entries of 117 films, of which 15 films were screened and awards were distributed in 16 categories.

The competition winners in 2019 included Forbidden Tikka Masala (Best Film), Naseeruddin Shah (Best Actor), Navni Parihar (Best Actress), Bhoomika Meena (Best Actress), Neena Gupta (Special Jury), Neeraj Yadav (Best Director) and Resul Pookutty (Best Sound Designing).

The following film and TV personalities participated in the 1st edition:

- Amrit Gangar
- Inamul Haque
- Bidita Bag
- Vikram Kochhar
- Vikas Khanna
- Nitin Kakkar
- Karthik Krishnan
- Sagar Sarhadi
- Major Bikramjeet Kanwarpal
- Rahul Bose
- Anjali Patil
- Sunil Pal
- Gadadhar Puty
- Ashok Purang
- Sandeep Nath.

== 2020 Festival ==
The second edition of the Golden Jury Film Festival was held in December 2020. It began on 14 December and conclude on 16 December. The Golden Jury Film Festival 2020 was launched by actor Vinay Pathak and Sharib Hashmi. The festival showcased 40 films out of 520 entries. Actor Rahul Bose, Nitin Kakkar, Bidita Bag, Inaamulhaq, Vikram Kochhar and Anjali Patil were guests at the festival while its jury members were Smita Jaykar, Shishir Sharma, Ashok Purang, Sandeep Nath and Gadadhar Putty.

== 2021 Festival ==
The 2021 edition of the Golden Jury Film Festival showcased a selection of 68 films from a total of 564 submissions. Shishir Sharma and Smita Jaykar contributed their expertise as jury members, alongside the National Award-winning director Gadadhar Puty and theatre personality Ashok Purang. Actor Divyenndu Sharma was honored with the Best Male Actor award for his performance in the film Mere Desh Ki Dharti, while the film's director received the Best Director award in the feature film category. Saurabh Shukla's film, The Incomplete Tale of Satyaprakash Paramkovid, secured the Best Feature Film award at the festival.

== 2022 Festival ==
The fourth edition of the festival was held in December 2022. It was attended by notable personalities from the film industry, including Pavan Malhotra, Gauahar Khan, Vikram Kochhar, Yashpal Sharma, Manoj Bakshi, J. D. Chakravarthy, Inaamulhaq, Saharsh Shukla, Girish Thapar, Nitin Kakkar, Mukesh Bhatt, Barkha Bisht, Shahid Mallya, and Arvinder Singh.

The jury includes Odia filmmaker Gadadhar Putty, lyricist Sandeep Nath, film theorist and curator Amrit Gangar, and acting coach Ashok Purang.

The film awards were given in 20 different categories, which included Documentary, Short, and Feature films. Some of the winning films were Vanrakshak, Midnight Delhi, Bright Future, Purple Case, Neither a girl nor a Woman, Behrupiya, Meet Mr. Chang, Dobya, Sambhram - Never Odd or Even, Between The Lines, Nimmo Lucknow Wali, Zibha, and Dammy.

== 2023 edition ==
The fifth edition of the Golden Jury Film Festival was held on 13 and 14 December 2023, with support from Uttar Pradesh Tourism, the Government of Uttar Pradesh. Notable figures from the film industry, such as Tejaswini Kolhapure, Brijendra Kala, Yashpal Sharma, Atul Srivastava, Inaamulhaq, Vikram Kochhar, Aditya Srivastava, Rajesh Jais, Shishir Sharma, Piyush Mishra, Smita Jaykar, and Mukesh Bhatt, among others, were in attendance.

A diverse range of films was showcased during the festival, including Piyush Mishra's Rare, Titu Ambani featuring Deepika Singh and Raghubir Yadav, Dada Lakhmi starring Yashpal Sharma, Kripiya Dhyan Dein, Ghost Walk, and several others. The closing film, Bed No. 17, directed by Mir Sarwar, concluded the event.

== 2024 edition ==
The 6th edition of the Golden Jury Film Festival was held on 17–18 December 2024 in Andheri West, Mumbai. It featured a diverse selection of films from Indian and international filmmakers.

The event opened with Mussoorie – 200 Years by Sanjay Raj, followed by the Golden Jury Festival Gala and the premiere of Kuch Sapney Apne by Sridhar Rangayan, a sequel to the award-winning Evening Shadows. The second day showcased films including What Goes Around – Karma is a Bitch by Ronald Kerkman, White Gaze by ETA, Muniya Ki Duniya by Alok Jain, and My National Flag by Sweta Kumar Dash. The festival concluded with Hunar by Sujoy Joy Mukherjee.

Special mentions included Iron Girls by Rajen Das on preserving folk arts and Muniya Ki Duniya about a migrant girl's aspirations.

== Awards ==
2019

Film	Category	Recipient
The Wallet (2019)	Best Actor Award	Naseeruddin Shah
The Wallet (2019)	Best Actor Female Award	Navni Parihar
Chuhedaani (2018)	Best Actor Female Award	Bhoomika Meena
Forbidden Tikka Masala (2018)	Best Film Award	Forbidden Tikka Masala
The Last Color (2019)	Special Jury Award	Neena Gupta
Sax By Julius	Best Sound Designing Award	Resul Pookutty
Sax By Julius	Best Director Award	Neeraj Yadav

2020

Film	Category	Recipient
Cold Calm (2020)	Best Feature Film	―
Neon Sea (2020)	Best Story	―
A Spoonful Of Stardust (2020)	Best Director	―
Dhumkkudiya (2019)	Best Actor (Female)	Rinkal Kachhap
First Signal	Best Actor (Male)	Paul Noonan
Hitlerin kadaisi ninaivugal	Best Short Film	―
The Quite shore	Best Actor - Short (Female)	Jeaux Bartley
Painful Pride	Best Actor - Short (Female)	Pallavi Joshi
Raani	Best Actor - Short (Male)	Dev Fauzdar
The Open Window	Best Animated Film	―
The Boro	Best Documentary Film	―
A Bohemian Musician	Best Director (documentary)	Rochak Sahu
An Incident In A Small Town	Best Script	―

2021

Film	Category	Recipient
Mere Desh Ki Dharti	Best Male Actor Award	Divyenndu Sharma
Mere Desh Ki Dharti	Best Director Award (Feature Film)	Faraz Haider
The Incomplete Tale of Satyaprakash Paramkovid	Best Feature Film	Saurabh Shukla
Chippipaarai	Best Short Film	Praveen Giri
The Iron Lady of Kashmir	Best Documentary Film	Suresh K. Goswami

2022

Film	Category	Recipient
Viral World	Best Feature Film	Brijesh Tangi
Vanrakshak	Best Director	Pawan Kumar Sharma
Midnight Delhi	Best Debut Director	Raakesh Rawat
Midnight Delhi	Best Actor (Male)	Mukesh Bhatt
Nimmo Lucknow Wali	Best Actor (Female)	Shikha Chauhan
Nimmo Lucknow Wali	Best Music	Arjun Tondon
Dobya	Best Short Film	Ashutosh Jare
Neither a Girl Nor a Woman	Best Documentary Film	Anjali Patil

2023

Film	Category	Recipient
Samanantar	Best Feature Film	Niraj Kumar Mishra
Dada Lakhmi	Best Director	Yashpal Sharma
Bed No. 17	Best Debut Director	Mir Sarwar
Kripya Dhyaan Dein	Best Actor (Male)	Brijendra Kala
Bed No. 17	Best Actor (Male)	Rishi Bhutani
Zindagi Kashmakash	Best Actor (Female)	Tejaswini Kolhapure
Titu Ambani	Best Actor (Female)	Deepika Singh
Mere Shiva	Best Music	Naman Anand, Ashutosh Bharadwaj
Ghost Walk	Best Short Film	Ananth Narayan Mahadevan
The Victims of Sundarbans	Best Documentary Film	Dilip Ghosh
Bridge	Best Social Film	Kripal Kalita

2024

Film	Category	Recipient
Iron Girls	Best Feature Film	Rajen Das (Director)
Peepal / Aashraya	Best Actor	Mukesh Bhat / Chaitanya Puri
National Flag	Best Short Film Director	Sweta Kumar Dash
Second Innings	Best Actor (Male)	Ashish Shukla
Fb_18, Good Morning General	Best Short Film	Prashant Singh / Pulkit Garg (Directors)
Hunar	Best Short Film (Jury Mention)	Sujoy Joy Mukharjee (Director)
Hunar	Best Actor (Male)	Rohit Roy
Hunar	Best Actor (Female)	Madhurima Tuli

== See also ==
- List of film festivals
- List of film festivals in India
