= Biswanath Rath =

Indian film director, screenwriter, editor and producer

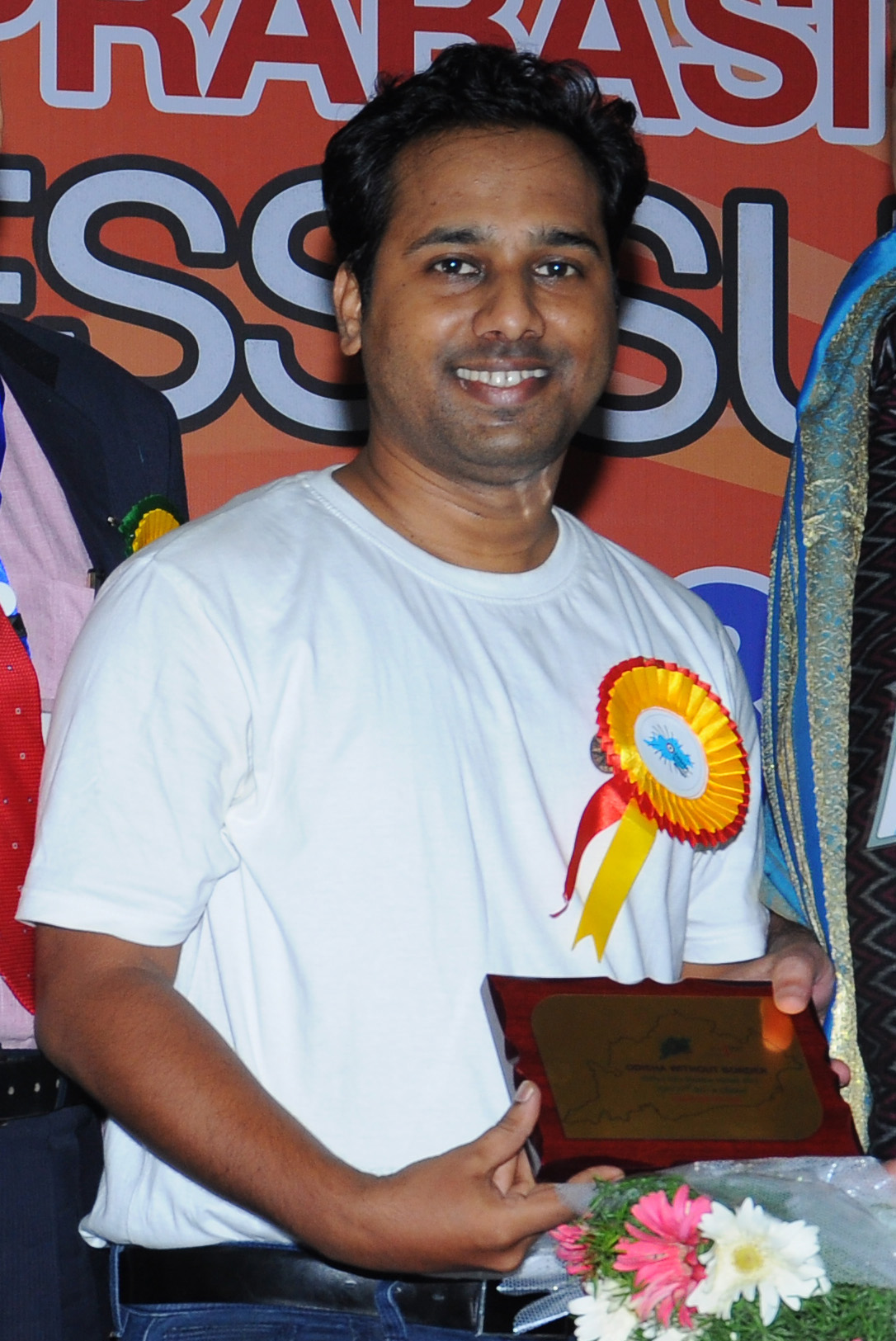
- Biswanath Rath being honoured at Prabasi Odia Business Summit, Chennai in April 2017
- Born: 18 June 1984 (age 42); Jeypore, Odisha, India
- Occupations: Film director, screenwriter, editor, producer
- Years active: 2013–present
- Spouse: Archana Rath
- Children: 1

Biswanath Rath is an Indian film director, screenwriter, editor and producer. His films have received a total of 647 recognition/awards in various International Film Festivals across the globe. He is the first Odia filmmaker to achieve the milestone of winning more than 600 film festival accolades which includes 206 awards. He is the founder of production company BnR Films LLP.

In 2024, Biswanath has created history in Festival de Cannes by showcasing Odisha's Kotpad Handloom for the first time in the festival.

== Work ==
His first short film, Kar Bhalaa, garnered a total of 56 International Film Festivals nominations and three awards. His debut music video is called "Feel the Passion". It has received 31 international film festival nominations. His first ad film, The 'Right' Glass is a social ad-film based on child rights, which has garnered 8 awards and 77 international film festival nominations. His Tamil music video, "Namma Chennai Chancey Illa," produced by national daily The Times of India with the theme celebration of Chennai and its culture, was premiered at TourFilm Riga - Tourism Film Festival in 2017. This video is a spiritual successor to Chancey Illa (2014). His English documentary, A Zero to Hero Collaborative Approach, released on World Food Day (2016) received the Audience Award at the AgriCulture Film Festival held in Rome (Italy) on 9 December 2017.

This documentary tells the inspirational success story of the collaboration between Dangarbheja Gram Panchayat (Nabarangpur) and a civil society organization named Govindalaya.

His silent short film, New Champion, received the Best Film in Indian Panorama Award at CMS International Children's Film Festival at Lucknow on 9 April 2018.

His English documentary, Kotpad Weaving: The Story of a Race Against Time, was telecasted on DD National on 24 March 2018. It explores the uniqueness of Kotpad Handloom, the issues and possible solutions for revival of Kotpad weaving and dyeing. The film had its Australian premiere at Sydney on 15 November 2018 as part of a handloom exhibition titled “The Kotpad Collection” organized by brand Kay Collections (founded by Kushma Ram). It had its Indian premiere at Kashmir World Film Festival, Srinagar on 30 November 2018 where it won the Best Short Documentary award. The film also features 2019 Padma Shri award recipient Gobardhan Panika. The documentary film has garnered a total of 51 international film festival nominations and 8 awards. This film is the world's first documentary film on Kotpad Handloom. In June 2020, the film premiered on Amazon Prime US, UK, Canada, Australia and other English-speaking territories of Amazon Prime, making it the documentary from Odisha to feature on a major global OTT platform.

In June 2020, his romantic Odia music video "ବର୍ଷା ଭିଜା ରାତି" ("Barshaa Bhijaa Raati") premiered on an OTT named IndieShorts, making it the first Odia music video to feature on a national OTT platform.

In August 2020, his friendship-themed Hindi music video, “Woh Bhi Kya Din the Yaar,” premiered on YouTube on Friendship day. This music video is India's first independently made crowd-sourced music video.

In November 2023, his feature documentary proposal 'Habaspuri Weaving: The Second and Last Death???' got selected in NFDC Film Bazaar Documentary Co-Production Market and was pitched in Film Bazaar Goa held between 20–24 November 2023. This documentary is the spiritual successor to his acclaimed handloom documentary 'Kotpad Weaving' and aspires to explore the uniqueness of Habaspuri Handloom as well as the issues and challenges faced by Habaspuri weavers from Kalahandi district (Odisha). This documentary proposal featured in the list of 12 Documentaries selected by NFDC team (for co-production market) out of 98 International entries. The documentary was shot in September 2024 and is currently in Post-production stage.

On 22 May 2024, Biswanath, in his very first visit to Festival de Cannes (77th Edition) created history by showcasing Kotpad Handloom in Cannes Film Festival for the first time. He also launched the posters of his upcoming Odia feature documentary ‘Habaspuri Weaving: The Second and Last Death???' on the same day. This marked a significant milestone in his journey to celebrate and preserve Odisha’s rich artisan heritage and create awareness about these lesser-known handloom traditions across the globe.

On its theatrical release on 27 Feb 2026 at PVR Cinemas in Bhubaneswar and Cuttack, Biswanath's critically acclaimed Odia film 'ChaariKaandha' created history by becoming the first Indian mid-length film to receive a commercial theatrical release.

As part of the National Handloom Day 2026 celebrations, on 7th August 2026, Ritupriya Productions (in association with BnR Films and MNM Entertainment) unveiled the Official Poster of Biswanath's Odia documentary “Habaspuri Weaving: The Second and Last Death ???”.

== Personal life ==
Biswanath Rath was born in Jeypore, Odisha to Raghunath Rath and Pramila Rath. He is an alumnus of the Department of Mechanical Engineering at National Institute of Technology, Warangal. From 2007 to 2010, he worked in Maruti Suzuki India Limited after which he moved to Chennai to learn filmmaking. At Chennai, he completed formal courses in Screenwriting and Film Direction and started his filmmaking career.

In 2015, he founded film production company BnR Films LLP with his wife Archana Rath.

== Awards and recognition from Indian socio-cultural associations ==
Year	Award	Event name	Organisation	Location
2017	Adarsh Prabasi Odia	Prabasi Odia Business Summit	Odisha Without Border	Chennai
2019	Utkal Shree	Utkal Divas (Odisha Day)	Thane Odia Association	Mumbai
2019	Adarsh Prabasi Samman	Raja Mahostav	Kalinga Swaraj Foundation	Pune
2019	Bartika Artist Award	Odisha Hastatanta Carnival	Bartika Handlooms	Bhubaneswar

== Filmography ==
Year	Title	Type/language	Director	Writer	Producer	Editor	Awards/festivals
2013	Kar Bhalaa	Short film (Hindi-Tamil)	Yes	Yes	Yes	No	(1) 2nd Best Short Film Award—Yuva Nirman Short Film Festival, Ahmednagar (2014) (2) Best Direction Award—Srishti Short Film Festival, Bhubaneswar (2015) (3) Nominated—Jaipur International Film Festival, Jaipur (2014) (4) Nominated—FilmSaaz International Film Festival, Aligarh (2014) (5) Nominated—Jagran Film Festival, Mumbai (2014) (6) Nominated—Smile International Film Festival for Children and Youth, New Delhi (2016)
2015	The 'Right' Glass	Social ad-film (silent)	Yes	Yes	Yes	Yes	(1) Best Fiction Award—Srishti Short Film Festival, Bhubaneswar (2015) (2) Children Choice Award—Kallola Short Film Festival, Bhubaneswar (2015) (3) Nominated—FilmSaaz International Film Festival, Aligarh (2015) (4) Nominated—Jagran Film Festival, Mumbai (2015) (5) Nominated—Development Film Festival, Madurai (2015) (6) Nominated—Kolkata International Film Festival, Kolkata (2015) (7) Nominated—CMS International Children's Film Festival, Lucknow (2016) (8) Nominated—Bradford Small World Film Festival, UK (2016) (9) Nominated—Phoenix Film Festival, USA (2016) (10) Nominated—Marano Ragazzi Spot Festival, Italy (2016) (11) Nominated—PickUrFlick Indie Film Festival, Bengaluru (2017) (12) Nominated—Cardiff Film Festival, UK (2017) (13) Nominated—International Open Film Festival, New York (2016) (14) The Encouragement Award—International Public Advertisement Festival of Seoul, South Korea (2020)(15) Best Filmmaker Award—Indian Creative Minds Film Festival, Mumbai (2021)
2015	Feel The Passion	Music video (English)	Yes	Yes	No	No	(1) Nominated—FilmSaaz International Film Festival, Aligarh (2016)(1) Nominated—FilmSaaz International Film Festival, Aligarh (2016)
2016	New Champion	Silent short film	Yes	Yes	Yes	Yes	(1) 'Best films in Indian Panorama' Award—CMS International Children's Film Festival, Lucknow (2018)
2016	A Zero To Hero; Collaborative Approach	Documentary (English)	Yes	Yes	Yes	Yes	(1) Audience Choice Award—AgriCulture Film Festival, Rome (2017) (2) Nominated—Cardiff Film Festival, UK (2017) (3)Semi-Finalist—G2 Green Earth Film Festival, Los Angeles (2017)
2017	Namma Chennai Chancey illa	Music video (Tamil)	Yes	Yes	No	No	(1) Nominated—Cardiff Film Festival, UK (2017)
2018	Kotpad Weaving : The Story of a Race Against Time	Documentary (English)	Yes	Yes	No	No	(1) World Premiere—Marin County International Festival of Short Film & Video, California (2018) (2) European Premiere—Zagreb Tourfilm Festival, Croatia (2018) (3) Award of Excellence-Metro Film & TV Awards, USA (2018) (4) Best Short Documentary Award—Kashmir World Film Festival, Srinagar (2018) (5) Best Documentary Award—Kala Samruddhi International Film Festival, Mumbai (2019) (6) Nominated—Smita Patil International Film Festival, Pune (2018) (7) Educational Screening—Asian College of Journalism, Chennai (2019) (8) Educational Screening—Golden Jubilee Convention by OSA, New Jersey (2019) (9) Nominated—Open Frame Film Festival, Delhi (2019) (10) Best Indian Film Award (in Documentary Category)-Sardar Vallabhbhai Patel International Film Festival, Surat (2020)
2018	ଶତ ପ୍ରତିଶତ Original (100% Original)	Comedy short film (Odia)	Yes	Yes	Yes	Yes	(1) Best Odia Film Award-Indian Creative Minds Film Festival, Mumbai (2021)
2019	WAR : Rescue. Release. Repeat	Documentary web series (Odia)	Yes	Yes	Yes	Yes	(1) World Premiere—The Lift-Off Sessions, UK (2020)
2019	Desh Dosti Etc	Short film (Hindi)	Yes	Yes	Yes	Yes	(1) Best Screenplay Award—Indian Creative Minds Film Festival, Mumbai (2021)
2019	ବର୍ଷା ଭିଜା ରାତି (Barshaa Bhijaa Raati)	Music video (Odia)	Yes	Yes	No	No	(1) World Premiere—The Lift-Off Sessions, UK (2020)
2020	Ravaiyaa	Short film (Hindi)	Yes	Yes	Yes	No	(1) Best Short Film Award-RATMA International Film Festival, UK (2020) (2) Best Thought Provoking Concept Award-Cinema of the World, Mumbai (2020) (3) Top Inspiring Film-Creative International Online Film Festival, Kolkata (2020) (4) Best Message Film (2nd Runner-up)-Indian International Film Awards, Bengaluru (2020) (5) Special Mention Jury Award-Cochin International Film Awards, Kerala (2020) (6) Special Festival Mention Award-South Indian International Film Awards, Bengaluru (2020) (7) Up Coming Filmmaker Award-Kolkata Online International Film Festival, Kolkata (2020) (8) Nominated-Indian Film Festival of Melbourne (9) Best Film Award-Cinemaking International Film Award, Dhaka (2020) (10) Honorable Mention-Huntington Beach Cultural Cinema Showcase, California (2021) (11) Best Picture Award- Indo American International Festival of World Cinema, Mumbai (2021) (12) Best Director Award-Indo American International Festival of World Cinema, Mumbai (2021) (13) Best Story Award-Indian Creative Minds Film Festival, Mumbai (2021) (14) Best Short Film Award-Aasha International Film Festival, Nashik (2021)
2020	India Jeetega	Music video (Hindi)	Yes	Yes	Yes	Yes	(1) Best Lyrics Award-Cinemaking International Film Award, Dhaka (2020) (2) Best Lyrics Award-Indian Creative Minds Film Festival, Mumbai (2021)
2020	Woh Bhi Kya Din the Yaar	Music video (Hindi)	Yes	Yes	Yes	No	(1) Best Music Video Award-Cochin International Film Awards, Kerala (2020) (2) Best Singer & Composer Award-Cochin International Film Awards, Kerala (2020) (3) Best Lyricist Award-Cochin International Film Awards, Kerala (2020) (4) Best Music Video Award(First Runner-Up)-Indian International Film Awards, Bengaluru (2020) (5) Best Singer Award-Indian International Film Awards, Bengaluru (2020) (6) Best Music Video Award(First Runner-Up)-Global Indie Film Awards, Kolkata (2020) (7) Best Male Singer Award-South Indian International Film Awards, Bengaluru (2020) (8) Best Music Video Award-Indian Creative Minds Film Festival, Mumbai (2021)
2022	Kahide Thare	Music video (Sambalpuri)	Yes	Yes	Yes	No	(1) Best Music Regional-Sambalpuri-Indogma Film Festival, Faridabad (2022) (2) Best Music Video Award-iDEAL International Film Festival, Sillod (2022) (3) Best Director-Music Video Award-iDEAL International Film Festival, Sillod (2022) (4) Best Music Video Award-Santa Dev International Film Festival, Tamil Nadu (2022) (5) Best Music Video Award-Canary International Film Festival, Tamil Nadu (2022) (6) Best Music Video Award-Rohip International Film Festival, Tamil Nadu (2023) (7) Best Music Video Award (Special Mention)-Diamond Bell International Film Festival, Tamil Nadu (2022) (8) Best Lyricist-Filmyway International Film Festival, Mumbai (2022) (9) Best Lyricist-Janjira International Film Festival, Maharashtra (2023) (10) Best Drama-International Grand Glory Film Awards, Imphal (2023) (11) Best VFX-International Grand Glory Film Awards, Imphal (2023) (12) Best Editing-International Grand Glory Film Awards, Imphal (2023)
2023	The SoulCatcher	Documentary (English)	Yes	Yes	Yes	Yes	(1) Official Selection-Global Film Exhibition, USA (2023) (2) Official Selection-Cinema of the World, New Delhi (2023) (3)Official Selection-AIU Film Festival, Jahra, Kuwait (2023)
2023	Tribal Fashion: The Dangaria Kandh Way	Documentary (English)	Yes	Yes	Yes	Yes	(1) Best Documentary Award-Roshani International Film Festival, Aurangabad (2024)
2023	Kahara Jiba	Short Film (Odia)	No	Yes	Yes	No	(1) Best Women Empowerment Project Award-Reels International Film Festival, Aurangabad (2024) (2) Best Social Awareness Short Film Award-Kodaikanal International Film Festival, Tamilnadu (2024) (3)Best Women Empowerment Film-Miseentage International Film Award (2024) (4) Best Drama Award-Indie Shorts Film Festival (2024) (5) Best Women Empowerment Project Award-Roshani International Film Festival, Aurangabad (2024)
2025	Mana Manasi/Tera Raanjhana/Rasia Pila	Trilingual Music Video (Odia/Hindi/Sambalpuri)	Yes	Yes	Yes	No	(1) Best Music Video Award-Malda International Film Festival Award, West Bengal (2025) (2) Best Music Video & Best Director Award-West Bengal International Film Festival Award, Kolkata (2025) (3)Best Music Video & Best Director Award-Indie Shorts Film Festival, Kolkata (2025) (4) Best Music Video & Best Story Award-Nepal Wings International Film Festival, Kathmandu (2025) (5) Best Music Video & Best Director Award-Kanyakumari International Film Awards, Tamilnadu (2025) (2025) (6) Best Music Video, Best Director & Best Story/Screenplay Award-Crown International Film Awards, Bangladesh (2025) (7) Best Director Award-One Leaf International Film Festival (2025)
2025	ChaariKaandha	Mid-length film (Odia)	Yes	Yes	No	No	(1) Best Short Film Award-Gossner Cine Fest, Ranchi (2025) (2) Jury Mention Award-Bengal International Short Film Festival, Kolkata (2025) (3)Outstanding Achievement Award-iDEAL International Film Festival, Aurangabad (2025) (4) Special Mention Jury-iDEAL International Film Festival, Aurangabad (2024)
2026	Habaspuri Weaving: The Second and Last Death???	Feature documentary (Odia)	Yes	Yes	No	No	
