= Kotpad Handloom fabrics =

Textile type from Odisha, India

Kotpad Handloom fabric
- Geographical indication
- Alternative names: Kotpad Handloom fabric
- Type: Handloom fabric
- Area: Kotpad, Koraput district, Odisha
- Country: India
- Material: Fabric

Kotpad Handloom is a vegetable-dyed fabric woven by the tribal weavers of the Mirgan community of Kotpad village in Koraput district, Odisha, India. Cotton sarees with solid border and Pata Anchal, duppatta with typical Buties / motifs, Scolrfs on cotton, silk, handloom stoles, and dress materials are all dyed with organic dyes. The natural dye is manufactured from the aul tree grown in this area. The Kotpad tussar silk saree with tribal art and Kotpad handloom fabrics with natural color is its specialty.

Kotpad handloom fabric is the first item from Odisha that received the Geographical Indication of India tag, in 2005. The Mirgan community of Kotpad is famous for their exquisite organic dyed textile. They usually weave this textile for "Bhotada", "Dharua" and other motifs of their neighboring tribal communities.

Recently, Biswanath Rath, an Indian Writer-Director, has made an English Documentary titled 'Kotpad Weaving : The Story of a Race Against Time' about Kotpad Handloom, dyeing and weaving which has been produced by PSBT in association with Doordarshan. This documentary was telecasted on DD National on 24 March 2018. The film explores the uniqueness of Kotpad Handloom, the issues and possible solutions for revival of Kotpad Weaving and Dyeing.

In 2018, Gobardhan Panika, one of the master weavers of the craft, was honored by the Government of India with the fourth highest civilian honor of the Padma Shri.

== Raw materials ==
Cotton yarn, Tussar silk and Aul tree roots are the main materials used for textile work. Using organic dye is the most important aspect of these textile products. It takes approximately 15 to 30 days for processing the color and dyeing threads into different colors. The main colors extracted are black and maroon. Sarees and shawls are the most important and attractive textile products from the Kotpad weaving community. The textiles are very comfortable to wear during summer and winter.

=== Natural dye colour ===
The characteristics of natural dye colouring are derived from the aul tree or madder dye (Morinda citrifolia) extracted from the root of the Indian madder tree. Since it is prepared out of natural resources which are non-toxic, the dye is not harmful to the skin. Even though it is only a limited colour range, it is eco-friendly and shades developed are very suitable and pleasant. The colours ranging from deep maroon to dark brown depend on the age of the root bark and the proportion of the dye used and is obtained with the addition of harikari or iron sulphate. These colours mixed with the natural unbleached off-white color of the cotton yarn produce dramatic results. The motifs used on the fabric are conch, boat, axes, crab, bow, temple, fish, and fan, which reflect the culture of the area. These motifs are developed by the extra wefts. By use of multi-shuttle by interlocking method, a solid border effect of the fabric is brought up by the pick by pick insertion of thread.

== See also ==
- Khadi
- Khādī Development and Village Industries Commission (Khadi Gramodyog)
