= Dehradun International Film Festival =

Indian film festival

Dehradun International Film Festival (DIFF) is a film festival, inaugurated in 2015, based in Dehradun and Uttarakhand and headquartered in New Delhi, India.

== Organizers ==
This festival is organized and filmmakers and other important personalities are invited. Awards are given in various cinema sectors, including regional cinemas.

== History ==
=== 2010s ===
The first edition of the festival was held in September 2015. The three-day event began on 25 September and was held principally at SilverCity Multiplex in Dehradun, with additional screenings at Tula's Institute. The programme included 19 films and short films, including international films and films screened in India for the first time. The opening film was The Japanese Wife, and the festival also included films from Taiwan and other countries.

At the closing ceremony of the inaugural edition, Uttarakhand Chief Minister Harish Rawat attended the event and actress Moushumi Chatterjee received a Lifetime Achievement Award. Other personalities associated with the first edition included Sushma Seth, Saurabh Shukla, Himani Shivpuri and Naseer Abdullah.

The second edition was held from 9 to 11 September 2016. It featured close to 30 films and provided opportunities for local producers, singers and actors to showcase their work. Regional, national and international films were screened during the festival.

In 2017, film director Subhash Ghai inaugurated the 3rd Dehradun International Film Festival. The festival's own historical listing identifies 2017 as its third edition and lists Ghai, Prem Chopra, Raza Murad, Mohan Agashe, Parvin Dabas and Payal Rohatgi among the guests associated with that edition.

The fourth edition was held from 21 to 23 September 2018 at Silver City, Rajpur Road, Dehradun. It showcased regional films, short films, documentaries and national and international award-winning films. The programme included films such as The Saviour, Noorie: The Light, Pankhuri, Kismat and Raja Bajrangi.

The fourth edition also featured filmmakers and actors including Ramesh Sippy, Sharman Joshi, Vivek Vaswani and Hemant Pandey. The organisers described the festival as a platform connecting local talent with established names from the film industry. The edition concluded with an award function covering short films, feature films and a Lifetime Achievement Award.

In 2019, the fifth edition was held in Dehradun. The festival's historical listing records guests including Biswajit Chatterjee, Govind Namdev, Priyanshu Chatterjee, Yashpal Sharma, Ranjeet and Dino Morea.

=== 2020s ===
During the Dehradun International Film Festival 2021, Uttarakhand Chief Minister Pushkar Singh Dhami presented the "Most Promising Actor" award to Aditya Seal.

The sixth edition was held from 17 to 19 September 2021. The festival's stated purpose was to bring nationally and internationally acclaimed films to audiences in Uttarakhand and to facilitate interaction between filmmakers and local audiences. The edition also sought to connect regional filmmakers and producers with the wider Indian film industry. The 2021 edition opened with the film Chintu Ka Birthday and included a retrospective of actress Mita Vashisht. The festival also collaborated with the OTT platform Freizeitmedia for film screenings.

The festival has also presented Lifetime Achievement Awards. According to coverage of the sixth edition, Moushumi Chatterjee, Sushma Seth, Sagar Sarhadi and Biswajit Chatterjee had received the honour in preceding years.

The seventh edition was held from 11 to 13 November 2022 at Silver City Multiplex in Dehradun. It opened with a specially dubbed screening of 83 for visually impaired audiences. The 2022 edition introduced the Uttarakhand Talent Hunt, which expanded the festival's programme beyond filmmaking to include dance and music. Filmmaker-producer Karan Razdan's film Hindutva was screened, while Razdan and producer Sachin Choudhary were felicitated by Uttarakhand Chief Minister Pushkar Singh Dhami. National Award-winning filmmaker Madhur Bhandarkar also participated in a discussion during the festival.

The eighth edition was held from 22 to 24 September 2023. It showcased 13 feature films and 53 short films in languages including Hindi, Bengali, Assamese, Garhwali and Kodava. The eighth edition also honoured film scholar Aruna Vasudev with a Lifetime Achievement Award. The festival described Vasudev as a major figure in Asian cinema, and the edition included films and discussions involving several filmmakers and actors.

The ninth edition was held from 27 to 29 September 2024 at Silver City in Dehradun. The programme included national and regional films, international films and a special screening of Sam Bahadur dubbed for visually impaired audiences. An open talent hunt for performers from Uttarakhand was also organised. Coverage of the ninth edition reported that more than 80 short films, documentaries and music albums were to be presented over the three-day programme, alongside international films from countries including Ireland, Morocco, Iran and the Philippines.

The ninth edition concluded in the presence of Uttarakhand cabinet ministers Subodh Uniyal and Saurabh Bahuguna. Actors and filmmakers including Ila Arun, Rajesh Sharma, Gajendra Chauhan, Adil Hussain, Manoj Joshi and Zakir Hussain were among those felicitated during the event.

The tenth edition was held from 7 to 9 November 2025 at Tula's Institute and a mall in Dehradun. The programme again included the Uttarakhand Talent Hunt, with participants divided into age groups and invited to compete in dance, acting, poetry, mimicry and singing. The 2025 edition included film screenings, discussions, panels and sessions for aspiring filmmakers. Guests included Sudipto Sen, Ranvir Shorey and Mukesh Khanna, among others.

The festival's 2025 brochure listed award categories for Lifetime Achievement, short films in fiction and non-fiction, and feature films in fiction and non-fiction. It also described the festival as including regional and international films, cultural performances and an award ceremony.

The eleventh edition was held from 2 to 4 October 2026 in Dehradun. The festival featured film screenings, talk shows, interactions with artists, panel discussions and cultural programmes and was held at a multiplex and a university in the city.

The 2026 programme included actors and filmmakers such as Shweta Tripathi, Rajesh Tailang, Mukesh Rishi, Deepak Parashar, Hiten Tejwani and Hemant Pandey.

One of the features of the 2026 edition was a special screening of Jolly LLB 3 for visually impaired students. The festival also held interactions between participating film personalities and students, alongside an Uttarakhand Talent Hunt for dance, acting, poetry, mimicry and singing.

The 2026 edition included the selection of the Konkani documentary Bhaangar Kalakusar Karigiri, directed by Goan filmmaker Prachi Shirodkar. The film was reported as the only film from Goa selected for the edition and was scheduled to be screened at TULAS University on 3 October 2026.

Another selection in the 2026 festival was the documentary Adi Kailash, directed by Harish Sharma and produced by Sandeep Jha. The film explores the cultural and spiritual significance of the Adi Kailash region in Uttarakhand and was selected for the eleventh edition.

Filmmaker Harish Sharma also had two documentaries, Adi Kailash and Brazil in Banaras: A Bhairab Dutt Story, and his debut music video Logon Mein Prem Hoga selected for the 2026 festival.
