= Best Film First =

Karnataka State Best Film First Award
- Awarded for: Best Film First Award in Karnataka State Film Awards
- Country: India
- Presented by: Karnataka State Government

The following is the list of Award winners for the Karnataka State Best Film First award.

Year	Winner
2010	Rasarushi Kuvempu
2009	Kabaddi
2008	Gulabi Talkies
2022	Rishi nikam

== See also ==
- Karnataka State Film Awards
