= Kotpad =

Kotpad Damayanti Nagar
- Town
- Location in Odisha, India Kotpad (India)
- Coordinates: 19.1624°N 82.3256°E
- Country: India
- State: Odisha
- District: Koraput

Population (2001)
  - Total: 14,914

Languages
  - Official: Odia
- Time zone: UTC+5:30 (IST)
- Vehicle registration: OD 10
- Website: odisha.gov.in

Kotpad is a town and a notified area committee in Koraput district in the Indian state of Odisha. Nearest railway station to Kotpad is Kotpad Road station which is a part of East Coast railway.

Kotpad is famous for Saree and Handloom products. Kotpad Handloom is a vegetable-dyed fabric woven by the tribal weavers of the Mirgan community of Kotpad village in Koraput.

Kotpad recently came to limelight because of director Biswanath Rath's award-winning movie Kotpad Weaving : The Story of a Race Against Time.

== Demographics ==
As of the 2001 India census, Kotpad had a population of 14,914. Males constitute 50% of the population and females 50%. Kotpad has an average literacy rate of 59%, lower than the national average of 59.5%: male literacy is 68%, and female literacy is 50%. In Kotpad, 13% of the population is under 6 years of age.

== Politics ==
Current MLA from Kotpad Assembly Constituency is Padmini Dian of BJD . The previous MLA from Kotpad Assembly Constituency is Chandrasekhar Majhi of INC, He is the brother of Basudev Majhi who won the seat in State elections in 2009 and also in 2004, 2000, 1995, 1985, 1980 (as candidate of INC(I)) and 1977.

Current MLA is RUPU BHATRA from BJP.

== Noteworthy ==
Kotpad is historically significant for Damanyanti Sagar, located near the Shiv Temple. The area was previously known as Damayantinagar.
