= Filmsaaz =

International short film festival organised in Aligarh Muslim University

- Awarded for: Best Short film in International and National category.
- Country: India
- Presented by: University Film Club, Aligarh Muslim University
- First award: 2008
- Website: cecamu.in/clubs/film-club/

Filmsaaz is an international short film festival that began in 2008 by the University Film Club, Aligarh Muslim University. Until the fifth edition of the festival in 2012, it was a national-level competition, but beginning with the sixth edition in 2013, the festival was opened to international entries. Since its inception, the university's Kennedy Auditorium has been used as the festival's screening venue.

== History ==
The film club was established in the 1973–74 academic session. The proposal was mooted with the University Grants Commission that film societies be established with the universities in India which was accepted and thus the film club was the outcome of such a proposal.

In 2013, after having conducted film workshop there, actor Adil Hussain was granted a lifetime membership in the university's film club.

A short film festival- Filmsaaz was conceived and begun in 2008 by the then secretary Adil Hossain. In 2013, under the secretary-ship of Arif Jwadder the 6th edition of the festival become international in scope. When first established, the festival was organized as a national short film festival with national and local categories but with its sixth installation, local categories were removed.

== Editions ==
Edition	Chief Guest	Year	Jury	Details
1	Tom Alter	2008		Tom Alter was the chief guest at 1st Filmsaaz or Filmsaaz 08 which was held from 28 to 30 March 2008.
2	Muzaffar Ali	2009		Muzaffar Ali was the chief guest at 2nd Filmsaaz or Filmsaaz 09.
3	Imtiaz Ali	2010		Imtiaz Ali (director) was the chief guest at the 3rd Filmsaaz or Filmsaaz 10 which was held from 5–7 March 2010.
4	Sudhir Mishra	2011		Sudhir Mishra was the chief guest at the 4th Filmsaaz or Filmsaaz 11 which was held from 8–9 March 2011.
5	Pitobash Tripathy	2012		Pitobash Tripathy was the chief guest at the 5th Filmsaaz or Filmsaaz 12 which was held from 19 to 21 March 2012.
6th	Nawazuddin Siddiqui	2013		Nawazuddin Siddiqui was the chief guest at the 6th Filmsaaz which was held from 3–5 March 2013 and gave the awards to the winners of the festival. From this edition it became international short film festival. The 6th Filmsaaz became controversial when the organizers allegedly put off screening a documentary based on the Kashmir conflict. The local categories were eliminated after 2012, when the event became international in scope. Now, only International and National categories are available.
7th	Tigmanshu Dhulia	2014	Anuj Kumar(The Hindu), Anna M.M. Vetticad, Parvez Imam	Tigmanshu Dhulia was the chief guest at the 7th Filmsaaz which was held from 9–12 March 2014. Film Critic Anuj Kumar(The Hindu), Anna M.M. Vetticad, Parvez Imam was the jury member of the festival.
8th	Ritesh Batra	2015	Zeishan Quadri	Ritesh Batra was the chief guest at the 8th Filmsaaz which was held from 10 to 12 March 2015. Piyush Mishra, Nimmi as guest of honor. Zeishan Quadri was the chief jury at the festival.
9th	Nishikant Kamat	2016		Nishikant Kamat was the chief guest of 9th Filmsaaz. 9th Filmsaaz held from 14 to 16 March 2016.
10th	Mohammed Zeeshan Ayyub	2017	Sharib Hashmi	The 10th Filmsaaz held from 21 to 23 February 2017. Zeeshan Ayyub was the Chief Guest of the 10th edition with Guest of Honour.
11th		2018		
12th	Ali Fazal	2019	Jatin Sarna Mohammed Zeeshan Ayyub Aarij Mirza	
13th		2025		

== See also ==
- AMU Journal
- Aligarh Muslim University
