= Centre for Civil Society =

Non-profit think tank in New Delhi

- Founder: Parth J Shah
- Established: 1997; 29 years ago
- Chief executive officer: Amit Chandra
- Members: ~50
- Location: New Delhi, India
- Website: www.ccs.in

Centre for Civil Society (CCS) is a non-profit think tank based in New Delhi that promotes freedom, individual rights and policy reform closely aligned with the principles of classical liberalism. It was founded in 1997 by Dr. Parth J. Shah, former Professor of Economics at the University of Michigan.

According to the 2021 Global Go To Think Tank Index Report (Think Tank and Civil Society Program, University of Pennsylvania), CCS was ranked 5th in India and 83rd in the world.

== Founder ==
Dr Parth Shah taught economics at the University of Michigan in Dearborn for seven years before returning to India to advocate for what he calls a 'Second Freedom Movement' for economic, social and political independence. He arrived at the conclusion that the statist model of governance was the reason for India's lack of development and decided to provide an alternative view through the Centre.

== Background ==
Centre for Civil Society's mission is to "advance social change through public policy". According to its website, the organisation's activities in education, livelihood and policy training are intended to promote choice and accountability in both private and public sectors of India. It further indicates that it seeks to translate policy into practice through engagement with policy experts, employing methods such as research, pilot projects, and policy training.

The organisation conducts reviews and analyses of public policies and uses these findings to make recommendations to the government. Its past work has spanned three sectors: Education, Livelihood, and Governance.

== Activities ==
=== Education ===
==== Foundational learning ====
- Bolo English is an educational program of the Centre for Civil Society aimed at improving spoken English proficiency among students in budget private schools in India. Implemented in collaborating with P&G Shiksha and the Rising Tide Foundation, the initiative combines educational technology with teacher training to enhance language learning outcomes. As of 2024, the program has trained 9,189 teachers from over 400 private schools across 20 states in India, reaching more than 350,000 students. CCS also organises the annual Bolo English Excellence Awards to recognize schools demonstrating notable progress in English language instruction.

K-12 education and budget private schools

- Since 2019, Centre for Civil Society has conducted research on state education systems and the regulatory frameworks governing K-12 education in India. This included creating a database of regulations affecting private schools across several states. The State of the Sector Report (2020) cited 6 reports from the organisation in its chapter on private school regulations and used data from this database in state profiles. These findings are said to align with elements of the National Education Policy (NEP) 2020, which highlighted the need to separate government functions and review the regulatory framework for education.

=== Livelihoods & Poverty Alleviation ===
==== Street vendors livelihood ====
- Centre for Civil Society (CCS) has been involved in policy discussions on street vending in India. The organisation is known to have provided testimony to Parliamentary Standing Committee reviewing the Street Vendors (Protection of Livelihood and Regulation of Street Vending) Act, 2014, and to draft proposed amendments to the legislation. CCS has also been nominated as a non-governmental representative on several Town Vending Committees, the statutory local bodies responsible for regulating street vending.
- Through its public interest law initiative, iJustice, CCS has provided legal representation to street vendors challenging penalties imposed under the Delhi Municipal Corporation Act, 1957. In Samjad v. South Delhi Municipal Corporation, vendors were fine ₹1,000 each under sections 357 and 397 of the DMC Act, despite the statute capping such penalties at ₹50 per section. The Additional Sessions Judge, Saket Court, set aside the order, holding that additional charges cannot be added after issuance of the challan and that the penalty under the cited sections could not exceed the statutory limit.

==== Ease of doing business for farmers ====
- CCS is known for publishing a primer, From Annadata to Farmpreneur, analysing challenges affecting the development of profitable agricultural markets in India. it released a policy brief, Unfree to Sell, examining restrictions on the domestic and international trade of farm produce.

===== Policy training and Outreach =====
- The CCS Academy, the policy draining division of the Centre for Civil Society that offers both introductory and advanced courses, such as ePolicy, eBaithak, eColloquiums, Researching Reality, with a focus on liberal ideas.
- In 2018, CCS established the Indian School of Public Policy, one-year postgraduate program in Policy design and management. The institution was founded with the aim of training professionals in policy practice and of expanding the availability of policy education in India.

===== Indian Liberals Archive =====
Indianliberals is a digital archive documenting the works and lives of Indian liberal thinkers. The project challenges the perception that liberal and libertarian ideas in India are largely derived from Western sources, by highlighting the country's indigenous liberal intellectual traditions. The initiative is administered by Centre for Civil Society in partnership with the Friedrich Naumann Foundation for Freedom. The archive comprises magazines, periodicals, interviews, regional literary works, and audio-visual material, and is supplemented by events and competitions intended to disseminate liberal thought.

== See also ==
- List of think tanks in India
