= Development Film Festival =

The Development Film Festival in India is a platform for film makers to showcase their works on themes concerning the development of the poor and vulnerable communities. The Centre for Development Communication of DHAN Foundation organises the festival. The festival is organised every year on a theme in development.

== Inception and growth of the festival ==
The past four festivals were organised at Madurai, the city known as a seat of learning since the Sangam periods dating back to 4th century B.C, The first festival focused on poverty, from the perspective of water, environment, gender, education, health and culture. The second festival focused on Water and life. The third festival focused on 'Water and People'. The fourth festival focused on ‘Culture and Heritage’. The fifth festival focused on ‘Fight Poverty: Connect and Commit for MDGs’, which was held in Chennai.

The films for screening were selected by a panel of film makers, development practitioners and academics. Films were screened to the public of Madurai, including school and college students. Best films were awarded.

== 2013 Festival (9th): Youth for Change ==
Held on 15 November 2013, with 13 films shortlisted and curated by a jury.

== 2010 Festival (6th): Democracy and Development ==
The 2010 Development Film Festival showcased documentaries, short films and animation films on the themes of Poverty and Democracy, Good Governance, Transparency and Accountability, Self–Help, Human rights and Democracy.

== 2009 Festival: Fight Poverty-Connect and Commit for Millennium Development Goals ==
The 2009 Development Film Festival brought film makers together to showcase the themes of Women and Children, Livelihoods, Food security, Education, Health, and Environment.
