= The Centrifuge Brain Project =

- Playlist cover art
- Directed by: Till Nowak
- Written by: Till Nowak
- Screenplay by: Till Nowak
- Produced by: Till Nowak
- Starring: Leslie Barany
- Cinematography: Ivan Robles Mendoza
- Edited by: Till Nowak
- Music by: Siriusmo; Sergio Garcia; Francesco Rivero
- Production company: FrameboX Digital
- Distributed by: Kurz Film Agentur Hamburg
- Release dates: October 12, 2011 (Filmfestival Münster)
- Running time: 7 minutes - 6.35 minutes
- Country: Germany
- Language: English

The Centrifuge Brain Project is a 2011 German short mockumentary fantasy film written and directed by Till Nowak. The film incorporates computer-generated imagery to create seven real-seeming fictional amusement park rides used in a faux documentary film about the construction of physics-defying rides intended for use in research efforts to improve human cognitive function. Nowak was inspired to create the project when visiting an amusement park in 2008.

== Background ==
=== Art installation ===
Creating the sequences for the seven rides took three months, spread out through 2008 and 2011. After Nowak created the short as the three-minute video presentation The Experience of Fliehkraft, it was shared as part of the art installation "A Lot of Civilisation" at various museums and international venues during 2011. Blueprint renderings of seven unique rides were displayed while a looped video presentation repeated on several screens. In 2011, the 3-minute art piece was presented in November 2011 as part of the solo exhibition "A Lot of Civilisation" during "Walk of Art" at Prototyp Museum in Hamburg, Germany. It was also presented at Ars Electronica in Linz, where it was awarded with an honorary mention, and SIGGRAPH in Vancouver, British Columbia, where it received a juried runner up. In 2012, it was presented at the Transmediale in Berlin, the Seoul Biennale in South Korea, and the 7th edition of Media City Seoul. Most recently it was presented at the Cité des Sciences et de l'Industrie in Paris as part of L' Art Robotique through January 2015.

=== Short film ===
As Nowak began sharing his faux blueprints and realistic clips as part of art installations, he also released The Centrifuge Brain Project. Its creation was inspired by his wish "to create an even stronger clash between realism and absurdity." Choosing a realistic approach, he chose the mockumentary style to allow viewers "to feel as if they were eye witnesses", and "to enhance the impact of the idea." As part of the film's plot, Nowak created the fictional "Institute for Centrifugal Research" as the researching firm and chose actor Leslie Barany for the role of Chief Engineer Dr. Nick Laslowicz. Barany was cast because of his ability to improv from the scripted lines to have them seem as if given in a real interview. Nowak related that "Barany was perfect for the role, because he turned out to be a very good liar."

Nowak had the monologue concept in his head for a while; the script was written just two days before filming. Nowak stated,

I had no technical reference for the short film. I created the manipulated amusement rides and the techy talk just out of my own scientific humor. They are a mix of real physics, absurdity and deliberate contradictions. The goal was to create the biggest possible mistake, but still make it sound serious and convincing.

Filming took two days – one day in an actual amusement park and one day in a laboratory – and editing took two months.

With the added storyline and the narration by Leslie Barany as Dr. Nick Laslowicz, the short film debuted in October 2011, at Filmfestival Münster. Its world premiere was on January 28, 2012 in France at the Clermont-Ferrand International Short Film Festival, followed by screenings on October 19 in Taiwan at the Kaohsiung Film Festival, November 17 in Germany at the Unlimited Film Festival Cologne. It showed on July 1, 2013 in the Czech Republic at the Karlovy Vary Film Festival, July 2 in France at the La Rochelle International Film Festival, and had its television debut December 21 on Yleisradio in Finland. After being published to YouTube in January 2013, the film received more than 3.3 million views. An unreleased alternate version has interview questions becoming so accusatory that Dr. Laslowicz becomes angry and walks away, cancelling the interview.

== Film synopsis ==
Dr. Nick Laslowicz (Leslie Barany) speaks toward the discovery of how playground merry-go-rounds increase creative activity in children and discusses the investigation of centrifugal force on human development to expand the human mind. He explains how his company, the Institute for Centrifugal Research (ICR), officially doubts the generally accepted laws of physics and has developed tests of human mental endurance disguised as amusement rides. He then describes how ICR developed a series of experiments as rides, created to test and expand a subject's mental growth. The first was the 1977 prototype 6 G-force Vertical Centrifuge which self-destructed in 1978.

ICR then joined forces with a company that built and distributed amusement park rides to develop projects and gain funding. Their first working machine was the 432-seat, 1.6 to 2.1 G-force "Spherothon" globular centrifuge in 1982. The second was 1985's 96-seat, 2.3 G-force "Wedding Cake Centrifuge", so named because of how its four platforms were layered one above the other.

In 1991, ICR shifted its concentration to height, and developed the 2844-seat, 1-G "High Altitude Conveyance" (HAC), which initially confused riders who were unaware the ride took fourteen hours. ICR learned that passengers would suffer from boredom on rides that were too long, specially for those passengers who had fallen asleep, missed disembarking, and had to ride an additional fourteen hours. In 2005, a redesign of the HAC added toilets and oxygen masks. Dr. Laslowicz explains that to deal with the boredom issue, in 1993, ICR created the 18-seat, 1.1 to 3.6 G-force "Expander", as a ride with an interactive component. Finding this created brain activity, in 1996 ICR created the 126-seat, 2.7 G-force "Dandelion" to simulate the prenatal experience of an embryo.

In 2003, ICR created the 10,000 horsepower 172-seat, 9-G "Steam Pressure Catapult" (SPC) to add a level of uncertainty which resulted in riders re-evaluating their own goals and aspirations. The last ride created was 2005's 12-seat, 17 G-force "Centriductor Schwingmaschine".

== Reception ==
Carl Zimmer of National Geographic referred to the film as one of his favorites from 2012, writing

I like The Centrifuge Brain Project so much because it toys with science in such a deadpan way–so deadpan that some commenters at Vimeo asked if the crazy amusement park rides were real or not. And yet, in the end, it's not a simplistic joke, but a short meditation on how we humans try to fight gravity–and nature in general–both in the lab and at amusement parks.

Writing in Huffington Post, Katherine Brooks called the film a hilarious mockumentary, adding "the visual renderings are mind-blowing enough." DVICE offered that humans are thrill-seekers by nature, and explains that as the reason why some would "leap from a 1,149-foot-tall tower or wait in line to ride the world's steepest roller coaster." They praised the film and its challenging the concept that brain activity would decrease when "riding high-speed, vomit-inducing amusement park rides," and concluded that while they were unable to decide their favorite ride of the seven, they enjoyed how protagonist Dr. Nick Laslowicz "tries to convince us that 'gravity is a mistake' and that brain activity actually increases when a person experiences his terrifyingly impossible park rides. Obviously, as a joke, all logic is thrown out of the window." Casey Chan of Gizmodo praised the film, writing "I don't like riding roller coasters because I'm a big weenie when it comes to mechanical excitement. But I have no problem believing that I would ride these ridiculously thrilling (and totally fake) roller coasters from the Centrifuge Brain Project," and also praised "the fake doc who would go to these lengths to manipulate the brain and push excess G-Force on people." Colossal writes that The Centrifuge Brain Project is "a brilliantly fun mockumentary". The Creators Project noted that people who like fast amusement park rides might scream to go faster even while being twisted upside down, but if they had the opportunity to ride the rides created for this film, their need for speed and terror would be well sated. They concluded "The film works because this detached documentary feel is intercut with mindboggling, fantastical rides brought to life with great skill—and reminiscent of Fernando Livschitz's films which put rides in the centre of cities like New York and Buenos Aires".

Founding editor Joey Paur of Geek Tyrant wrote of The Centrifuge Brain Project's screening at San Diego Comic-Con in 2012, calling it an "amazing short film", and expanding "out of all the films they ended up showing this was my favorite, and I can guarantee it's going to entertain the hell out of you!" First Showing wrote of the 14th Annual Animation Show of Shows at Comic-Con 2013 and labeled the film "incredible" and "worth watching", expanding that of the films screened, "one that really tickled our fancy was a live-action faux documentary called The Centrifuge Brain Project. The film follows the studies of pseudo-mad scientist Dr. Nick Laslowicz and his wild amusement park prototypes, brought to life by some impressive visual effects work." TV QC wrote that the film is "a fun and especially brilliant documentary".

GBTimes writes that with having seen his own "film hundreds of times in different movie theaters, sometimes with ten people, other times with 500 people in the audience," Till Nowak loves to watch audience reactions as they watch the film, and is bemused that "some people have perceived it as a real documentary of real amusement parks." He has stated,

there are actually still people, especially if they see it on the internet, that really think everything is real. To me that is super interesting because the film is also about our reception of media, how we believe everything, how media can manipulate us. I had never expected that a lot of people would believe the whole film. I thought okay, maybe the first half, but then... For me as a filmmaker and my filmmaker friends, it is very obvious. But people who are not working with the media, it is very surprising for me, how much they believe. Sometimes it is a bit shocking – but also an honor and a compliment because it means that the film was convincing,

and that to "amusement park enthusiasts it feels almost like a pity that these rides are not real." He explains,

the bizarre thing is that if it would be possible, they would also exist. The only reason these things do not exist in this crazy world that we live in is that they are physically impossible. The constructions I did in this film, they would collapse. They are just not logical. The forces do not work right like the gravity and centrifugal force, and everything is a deliberate mistake that I made to illustrate this. But people would build it if it was possible.

== Partial list of awards and nominations ==
=== The Experience of Fliehkraft ===
- 2011, Honorary mention at Ars Electronica in Linz
- 2011, Juried runner up at SIGGRAPH 2011.

=== The Centrifuge Brain Project ===
- 2011, Won Audience Award at Filmfestival Münster
- 2011, Won jury award and audience award for 'Best Short Film' at San Sebastián Horror and Fantasy Film Festival
- 2011, Won Pille Filmgeräteverleih Prize and 2nd place in the German Competition at Exground Filmfest
- 2012, Won Kurosawa Award for creative excellence at 24FPS International Short Film Festival
- 2012, Won Audience Award at Alcalá de Henares, Alcine
- 2012, Nominated for Le Cristal d'Annecy at Annecy International Animated Film Festival
- 2012, Won Jury Award for 'Best Short Film' at Aspen Shortsfest
- 2012, Nominated for Golden Horseman award for 'Best Short Fiction Film – National Competition' at Filmfest Dresden
- 2012, Won Youth Jury Award Honorable Mention for 'National Competition' at Filmfest Dresden
- 2012, Won Deutscher Kurzfilmpreis for 'Outstanding Short Film' at German Short Film Awards
- 2012, Won Audience Liberté Award for 'International Competition' at Hamburg International Short Film Festival
- 2012, Won Russian Film Clubs Federation Award and a First Place award for 'Best Short Film' at Moscow International Film Festival
- 2012, Won Audience Award at Filmfest München
- 2012, Won Honorable Mention for 'Short Film' at International Short Film Festival Oberhausen
- 2012, Won Audience Award in 'German Competition' and won 'Best German Short Film Special Mention' at Regensburg Short Film Week
- 2012, Won Kurosawa Award for creative excellence at 24FPS International Short Film Festival'
- 2012, Won 'Best Producer' at Abu Dhabi Film Festival
