= Till Nowak =

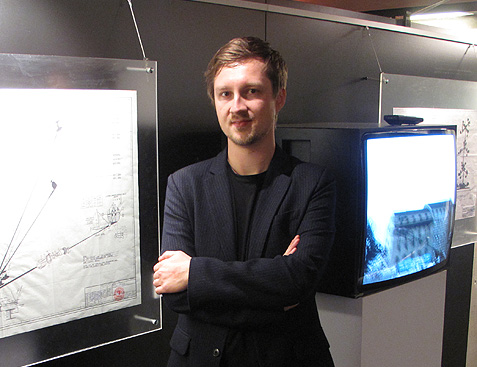
- Nowak standing in front of art installation; "The Experience of Fliehkraft"
- Born: July 28, 1980 (age 46); Bonn, Bad Godesberg, Germany
- Education: University of Applied Sciences
- Occupations: Film director; Screenwriter; Film producer; Digital artist; Graphic designer; Visual artist; Filmmaker
- Years active: 1999–present
- Employer: FrameboX
- Known for: Delivery; The Experience of Fliehkraft; The Centrifuge Brain Project; Dissonance
- Relatives: Nik Nowak (brother)
- Awards: Multiple
- Website: www.tillnowak.com

Till Nowak is a German digital artist and visual artist, graphic designer and filmmaker. He received recognition for his grad project, the 2005 film Delivery, and for his art piece The Experience of Fliehkraft and its film offshoot The Centrifuge Brain Project, both released in 2011, and more recently for his 2015 film Dissonance.

== Background ==
Till Nowak was born 28 July 1980, in Bonn, Germany, and until 2008 lived in Mainz. He was born to artistic parents; his mother taught ceramics to children and his father was a painter and teacher. At age 19 in 1999, he founded and began work in his own studio FrameboX. From 2000 to 2005, he studied media design at the University of Applied Sciences in Mainz. He has collaborated with his brother Nik Nowak, and states when the two get together the ideas flow.

For his thesis project at the University of Applied Sciences, in 2005 Nowak wrote, directed, and produced Delivery, a 9-minute animated film which screened at more than 200 international film festivals, winning more than 35 awards, including those from AFI Fest Hollywood, Annecy International Animated Film Festival, Friedrich Wilhelm Murnau Kurzfilmpreis, and a nomination from the European Film Awards. He had first shared the film on an internet forum discussing simulated 3-D in film, the resulting attention included hundreds of emails with job offers and festival invitations.

After leaving Mainz in 2008, Nowak took up residence Hamburg. He is a member of both the German Film Academy and the European Film Academy. In spring of 2013, he was signed by UTA. In April 2015, Nowak and his family moved to Los Angeles, California.

In June 2024, he was invited to join the Academy of Motion Picture Arts and Sciences as a member of the Production Design branch.

== Projects ==
Till Nowak is known for his 2005 film Delivery, his 2011 art piece The Experience of Fliehkraft, and the related award-winning 2011 film The Centrifuge Brain Project. The latter two focus on a series of odd (and physically impossible) rides that he was inspired to create when visiting an amusement park in 2008. Creating the sequences for the seven rides took three months, spread out through 2008 and 2011. The Experience of Fliehkraft debuted in 2011 as part of the solo exhibition "A Lot of Civilisation" during "Walk of Art" at Prototyp Museum in Hamburg, Germany.

Touring as part of the art installation "A Lot of Civilisation", the art piece visited numerous museums and international venues, including Ars Electronica in Linz and SIGGRAPH in Vancouver, British Columbia in 2011, the Transmediale in Berlin and the Seoul Biennale in South Korea and the 7th edition of Media City Seoul in 2012, and most recently at the Cité des Sciences et de l'Industrie in Paris as part of L' Art Robotique through January 2015.

As Nowak began sharing his faux blueprints and realistic clips as part art installations, he released The Centrifuge Brain Project. Its creation was inspired by wanting "to create an even stronger clash between realism and absurdity." Choosing a realistic approach, he used the mockumentary style to allow viewers "to feel as if they were eye witnesses", and "to enhance the impact of the idea." As part of the film's plot, he creating a fictional research company and hired an actor to play the firm's Chief Engineer. Nowak had the monologue concept in his head for a while, but the script was written just two days before filming. Nowak stated, "I had no technical reference for the short film. I created the manipulated amusement rides and the techy talk just out of my own scientific humor. They are a mix of real physics, absurdity and deliberate contradictions. The goal was to create the biggest possible mistake, but still make it sound serious and convincing." Filming took two days – one day in an actual amusement park and one day in a laboratory – and editing took two months.

== Filmography ==
- Epiphania (2005) (visual effects)
- Delivery (2005) (writer, director, producer)
- Göring - Eine Karriere (2006) (art director)
- Rommels Schatz (2007) (digital artist)
- Rommels Krieg (2007) (visual effects)
- Zum dritten Pol (2007) (visual effects)
- Mythos & Wahrheit – Der Kennedy-Mord (2007) (visual effects supervisor)
- Die Eylandt Recherche (2008) (visual effects supervisor)
- Flucht in die Freiheit – Mit dem Mut der Verzweiflung (2009) (animator)
- Flucht in die Freiheit – Mit allen Mitteln (2009) (animator)
- Der Wettlauf zum Südpol – Deutschland gegen Österreich (5 episodes, 2011) (animator)
- Der Wettlauf zum Südpol – Amundsen gegen Scott (1 episodes, 2011) (animator)
- Arthur Christmas (2011) (set designer)
- Alien Fans II (2012) (himself)
- The Centrifuge Brain Project (2012)
- Dissonance (2015) (writer, director, producer)
- Ron's Gone Wrong (2021) (art director)

== Recognition ==
In 2006, after Delivery had screened at Audi Festival of German Films in Australia, Die Woche in Australien Called Nowak a "rising young star" and praised Delivery as a successful exploration. Variety made note that Nowak "is a well known artist who made a splash with his directorial debut of the short film, The Delivery in 2005 which went on to win numerous awards including the Jury Award for Best Short and Audience Award for Best Short at the 2005 AFI Festival." When under 2015 Oscar consideration, his film Dissonance is described to be "Evocative of Christopher Nolan’s surreal Inception, as well as Michel Gondry’s sci-fi standout, Eternal Sunshine of the Spotless Mind.

=== Partial awards and nominations ===
==== Delivery ====
- 2005, Won both 'Short Award' and Audience Award' at AFI Fest
- 2005, Won Prix UIP Ghent (European Short Film) at Ghent International Film Festival
- 2005, Won Audience Award - Student Competition for 'Best Animation Film' at Wiesbaden goEast
- 2005, Won Hamburg Animation Award for 'Best Short Film' at OFFF Barcelona
- 2005, Won the Bergischer Filmpreis for 'Best Animation'
- 2006, Won Friedrich-Wilhelm-Murnau 'Short Film Award'
- 2006, Won Jean-Luc Xiberras Award for a First Film at Annecy International Animated Film Festival
- 2006, Won 2nd place Children's Jury Award at Chicago International Children's Film Festival
- 2006, Nominated for 'Best Short Film Award' at European Film Awards
- 2006, Won Audience Award at Hamburg International Short Film Festival
- 2006, Won Prix du Conseil Général at Pontault-Combault Short Film Festival
- 2006, Won Jury Prize for 'Best Short film' at San Sebastián Horror and Fantasy Film Festival
- 2006, Won 'Best Animation' at Tehran Short Film Festival
- 2006, Won Festival Prize for 'Best Animation' at Toronto Fantasy Worldwide Film Festival
- 2007, Won Gold Award for 'Animation' at Crested Butte Film Festival
- 2007, Won Jury Award for 'Best Animated Short' at Durango Film Festival
- 2007, Won Special Jury Award for 'Best Short Film' at Montecatini Filmvideo – International Short Film Festival
- 2007, Won both 'Director's Choice Award' and 'Excellence in Filmmaking' at Sedona International Film Festival
- 2007, Won Golden Glibb for 'Best Short Film' at Weekend of Fear, Nuremberg, Germany
- 2007, Won Jury Award for 'Best Animation' at Byron Bay International Film Festival for the film Delivery

==== The Experience of Fliehkraft ====
- 2011, Won honorary mention at Ars Electronica
- 2011, Won juried runner up at SIGGRAPH 2011.

==== The Centrifuge Brain Project ====
- 2011, Won jury award and audience award for 'Best Short Film' at San Sebastián Horror and Fantasy Film Festival
- 2012, Nominated for Le Cristal d'Annecy at Annecy International Animated Film Festival
- 2012, Won Jury Award for 'Best Short Short' at Aspen Shortsfest
- 2012, Won Youth Jury Award Honorable Mention for 'National Competition' at Filmfest Dresden
- 2012, Nominated for Golden Horseman award for 'Best Short Fiction Film – National Competition' at Filmfest Dresden
- 2012, Won Short Film Award in Gold for 'Outstanding Short Film' at German Short Film Awards
- 2012, Won Audience Liberté Award for 'International Competition' at Hamburg International Short Film Festival
- 2012, Won Russian Film Clubs Federation Award and a First Place award for 'Best Short Film' at Moscow International Film Festival
- 2012, Won Deutscher Kurzfilmpreis for 'Outstanding Short Film' at German Short Film Awards
- 2012, Won Audience Award at Filmfest München
- 2012, Won Honorable Mention for 'Short Film' at International Short Film Festival Oberhausen
- 2012, Won Audience Award in 'German Competition' and won 'Best German Short Film Special Mention' at Regensburg Short Film Week
- 2012, Won Kurosawa Award for creative excellence at 24FPS International Short Film Festival'
- 2012, Won 'Best Producer' at Abu Dhabi Film Festival

==== Dissonance ====
- 2015, Won 'Jury Award' Grand Prix at Anima Mundi Animation Festival
- 2015, Won 'Sacem Award for Original Music' at Annecy International Animated Film Festival
- 2015, Won Prix UIP Berlin at Berlin International Film Festival for Till Nowak
- 2015, Won Audience Award for 'Best Animated Short Film' at Fancine Festival de Cine Fantastico de la Universidad de Malaga
- 2015, won 'Best Animation' at Aspen Shortsfest International
- 2015, nominated for Golden Berlin Bear for 'Best Short Film' by European Film Academy at Berlin International Film Festival
- 2015, Won Deutscher Filmmusikpreis (German Film Music Award) for 'Best Music in a Film' at German Film Score Awards
- 2015, nominated for 'Best Short Film' at Edinburgh International Film Festival
- 2015, Won VFX Award for 'Best Visual Effects' at HollyShorts Film Festival
- 2015, nominated for European Film Award for 'European Short Film' at European Film Awards
- 2015, Won Don Quixote Award at Krakow Film Festival
- 2015, Won Best International ShortWork Award for 'Best International Shortfilm' at Whistler Film Festival
- 2016, Won 'Best Use of Digital Technology in a Short Film' at Flickerfest International Short Film Festival
- 2016, nominated for 'Best Animated Short Subject' at Annie Awards
