= We Are the Faithful =

- Directed by: Michael Koch
- Produced by: Michael Koch
- Cinematography: Andrea Gsell, Michael Koch
- Edited by: Michael Koch
- Music by: Nica Giuliani
- Distributed by: Academy of Media Arts Cologne
- Release date: 28 October 2005 (Hof)
- Running time: 9 minutes 20 seconds
- Countries: Switzerland; Germany
- Language: Swiss German

We Are the Faithful (German Wir sind dir treu) is a 2005 documentary short film produced and directed by Swiss Michael Koch. It was premiered at the Hof International Film Festival on 28 October 2005. The film is entirely spoken in Baseldytsch, a Swiss German dialect, but subtitles in Standard German and English are shown.

== Synopsis ==
The film's subject is the stadium culture of FC Basel supporters during a game (FC Basel vs FC Zürich) in 2005 at the St. Jakob-Park and the importance of the chief supporter cheering on the crowd. He is responsible for the atmosphere during the football match. The chief supporter tunes the songs, sets the rhythm, animates and choreographs the fans.

== Release and Reception ==
The film was shown at numerous German and foreign film festivals and received several awards, amongst them in Clermont-Ferrand winning the Canal+ Award. On 8 June 2007 the film was also shown at the opening night screening of Rooftop Films in New York City, United States.

== Controversy ==
The film is heavily disputed amongst supporters of FC Basel. In 2006, the chief supporter denied to agree on any further public presentations.

== Awards (Selection) ==
- 2005: International Short Film Festival Winterthur – Prize for the Best Swiss Short Film for Michael Koch
- 2005: Kassel Dokfest - Nomination for the Award Golden Key (Best Documentary Short) for Michael Koch
- 2006: Clermont-Ferrand International Short Film Festival – Canal+ Award in the category Lab Competition for Michael Koch
- 2006: Schwerin Art of Film Festival - Short Film Promotional Award in the category Best Short Documentary for Michael Koch
- 2006: Documenta Madrid - Audience Award and Special Mention in the category Best Short Documentary for Michael Koch
- 2006: Huesca Film Festival - Mención Especial del Jurado (Special Mention by the jury) for Michael Koch
- 2006: Milan Film Festival - Special Mention in the category Best Short Film for Michael Koch
- 2006: Internationales Festival der Filmhochschulen München - ARRI-Award for Michael Koch
- 2006: Internationales Festival der Filmhochschulen München - Arte-Shortfilm-Award for Michael Koch
