= Michael Koch (film director) =

Swiss film director and screenwriter

Michel Koch
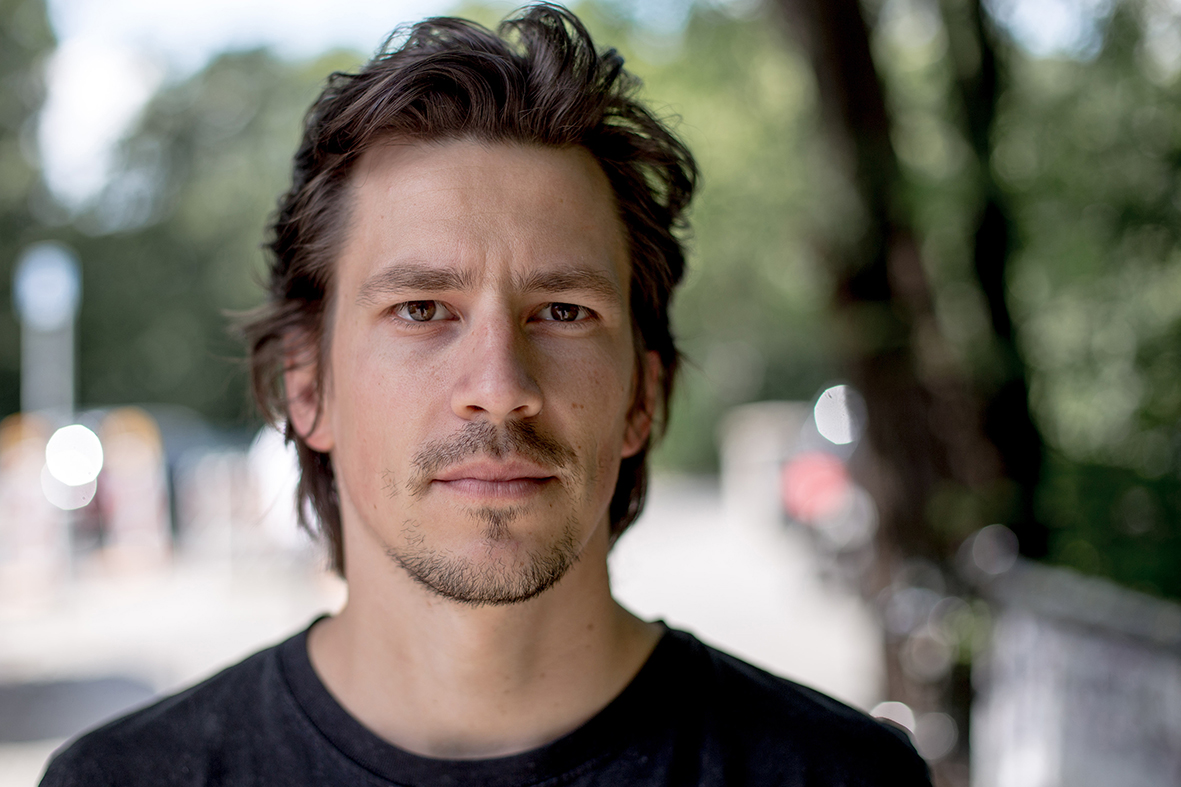
- Koch in 2016
- Born: 2 July 1982 (age 44); Lucerne, Switzerland
- Occupation: Filmmaker

Michael Koch (born 2 July 1982) is a Swiss filmmaker. Most known for his romantic-drama film A Piece of Sky (2022).

== Early life ==
At the age of 17 Koch made his acting debut at the Young Theater of Basel (Junges Theater Basel), where he appeared in further productions until 2002. In 2003 he played the lead role in the Swiss comedy Achtung, fertig, Charlie!. In the same year, Koch began studying at the Academy of Media Arts Cologne, while at the same time working occasionally as an actor for television films until 2007.

== Career ==
As a director, Koch made several short films during his studies, which were shown at many German and foreign film festivals and received numerous awards. In 2005, his short documentary film We Are the Faithful about the chief supporter in the FC Basel fan curve was released. The following short feature film Beckenrand from 2006, about a tragic confrontation between a youth clique and a lifeguard, was also nominated for the German Short Film Award in Gold in 2007. For his diploma film Polar, Koch received a Special Mention at the 59th Berlin International Film Festival in 2009 and the German Short Film Award in Gold.

He went on to direct two theater plays in Switzerland, which were performed in Basel in 2009, 2011 and 2012.

In 2016 Koch's feature-length film debut Marija was released, for which he wrote the screenplay together with Julian Großheim. In the same year, the film premiered in the international competition of the Locarno Film Festival in Switzerland. Marija screened at many German and foreign film festivals, won national and international awards, and was released in German cinemas on 9 March 2017.

Koch's second feature film A Piece of Sky (Drii Winter) was screened in the international competition at the 72nd Berlin International Film Festival in 2022 and received a Special Mention.

Furthermore, he works as a docent at the International Film School Cologne.

== Filmography ==
=== Feature films ===
Year	English Title	Original Title	Notes
2016	Marija		
2022	A Piece of Sky	Drii Winter	
TBA	Erosion		In production

=== Short films ===
- 2005: We Are the Faithful (Wir sind dir treu), also cinematographer, editor and producer
- 2006: Beckenrand, also editor
- 2009: Polar

=== As actor ===
- 2003: Ready, steady, Charlie!
- 2005: Tod einer Ärztin (TV movie)
- 2007: Liebe und Wahn (TV movie)

== Theater ==
- 2009: „Wilde Herzen“ by Simon Froehling, Treibstoff Theatertage Basel, Kaserne Basel, (director)
- 2011–2012: „Mein Kopfschuss sitzt nicht“ by DeinKurt in co-production with the Kaserne Basel and in cooperation with the Staatsarchiv Basel-Stadt, (direction and concept)

== Accolades ==
- 2004: 54th Berlin International Film Festival - Shooting Stars Award
- 2006: Clermont-Ferrand International Short Film Festival – Canal+ Award in the category Lab Competition for We Are the Faithful
- 2006: Internationales Festival der Filmhochschulen München - ARRI-Award and Arte-Shortfilm-Award for We Are the Faithful
- 2006: Schwerin Art of Film Festival - Short Film Promotional Award in the category Best Short Documentary for We Are the Faithful
- 2006: Locarno Film Festival - Nomination for the Pardi di domani (Leopards of Tomorrow) - Award for Beckenrand
- 2009: Berlin International Film Festival - DIALOGUE en Perspective - Special Mention for Polar
- 2009: Filmfest Dresden - Award Golden Horseman (Goldener Reiter) in the category Best Short Fiction Film - National Competition for Polar
- 2009: German Short Film Award - Short Film Award in Gold in the category Outstanding Short Film - 7 to 30 Minutes Length for Polar
- 2009: Warsaw International Film Festival - Nomination for Best Short in the category Shorts Competition for Polar
- 2016: Locarno Film Festival - Nomination for the Golden Leopard in the category Best film for Marija
- 2017: Glasgow Film Festival - Nomination for the Audience Award for Marija
- 2017: Minneapolis–Saint Paul International Film Festival - Nomination for the Emerging Filmmaker Award for Marija
- 2017: Mons International Film Festival - Le Coup de cœur du Jury (Jury - Prize) in the Official Competition (feature-length films) for Marija
- 2017: Prague International Film Festival - Amnesty International Febio Fest Award in the category Best Film for Marija
- 2017: Swiss Film Award - Nomination for the Swiss Film Award in the category Best Fiction Film for Marija
- 2021: Karlovy Vary International Film Festival - TRT Award in the category First Cut+ for A Piece of Sky
- 2022: 72nd Berlin International Film Festival - Special Mention and Nomination for the Golden Bear in the international competition for A Piece of Sky
