= Delivery (2005 film) =

2005 film

- film poster
- Directed by: Till Nowak
- Written by: Till Nowak
- Produced by: Till Nowak
- Cinematography: Till Nowak
- Edited by: Till Nowak
- Music by: Andreas Hornschuh; Matthias Hornschuh
- Production company: FrameboX
- Distributed by: KurzFilmAgentur Hamburg
- Release dates: 9 April 2005 (Wiesbaden GoEast Film Festival)
- Running time: 9 minutes
- Country: Germany
- Language: English

Delivery is a 2005 animated short film by German digital and visual artist, graphic designer and filmmaker Till Nowak, created as his thesis film project.

== Background ==
Nowak wrote and produced the film in 2005 as his thesis project at the University of Applied Sciences in Mainz. He had no expectation that anything would develop from releasing the film, and stated "I didn’t expect this little film to change my life, but it all went really crazy. At first, when I entered it only into some small festivals, I didn’t have big plans for it. I just thought that one or two festivals would be nice to show the film and meet some people. Then the film won awards in the first three festivals and I recognized that it had much more potential. Over three years I travelled to Australia, Korea, USA, Spain and many other countries and until now the film has been screened in more than 200 festivals. I have sold it to some TV stations in some countries and won more than 35 awards." [sic] These events caused Nowak to change his professional focus from commercial advertising work to independent art and film. Among the film's many awards were those from AFI Fest Hollywood, Annecy International Animated Film Festival, Friedrich Wilhelm Murnau Kurzfilmpreis, and a nomination from the European Film Awards. He had first shared the film on an internet forum discussing simulated 3-D in film, the resulting attention included hundreds of emails with job offers and festival invitations.

== Plot ==
A lonely senior lives in a gloomy and dirty factory town and dedicates himself to caring for a small potted plant on his balcony. The world around him is dying, as is the flower on his plant. One day he receives a mysterious box in the mail, one which enables him to have impacting effects on his surroundings.

== Recognition ==
In 2006, after Delivery had screened at Audi Festival of German Films in Australia, Die Woche in Australien Called Nowak a rising young star" and praised his film Delivery as a successful exploration. Katja Sprenz of Schnitt praised the film in her review, and Frankfurter Allgemeine Zeitung also praised the film, its story, and its creator.

=== Partial awards and nominations ===
- 2005, Won both 'Short Award' and Audience Award' at AFI Fest
- 2005, Won Prix UIP Ghent (European Short Film) at Ghent International Film Festival
- 2005, Won Audience Award - Student Competition for 'Best Animation Film' at Wiesbaden goEast
- 2005, Won Hamburg Animation Award for 'Best Short Film' at OFFF Barcelona
- 2005, Won the Bergischer Filmpreis for 'Best Animation'
- 2006, Won Friedrich-Wilhelm-Murnau 'Short Film Award'
- 2006, Won Jean-Luc Xiberras Award for a First Film at Annecy International Animated Film Festival
- 2006, Won 2nd place Children's Jury Award at Chicago International Children's Film Festival
- 2006, Nominated for 'Best Short Film Award' at European Film Awards
- 2006, Won Audience Award at Hamburg International Short Film Festival
- 2006, Won Prix du Conseil Général at Pontault-Combault Short Film Festival
- 2006, Won Jury Prize for 'Best Short film' at San Sebastián Horror and Fantasy Film Festival
- 2006, Won 'Best Animation' at Tehran Short Film Festival
- 2006, Won Festival Prize for 'Best Animation' at Toronto Fantasy Worldwide Film Festival
- 2007, Won Gold Award for 'Animation' at Crested Butte Film Festival
- 2007, Won Audience Award for 'best animation' at Anifest Hungary
- 2007, Won Jury Award for 'Best Animated Short' at Durango Film Festival
- 2007, Won Special Jury Award for 'Best Short Film' at Montecatini Filmvideo - International Short Film Festival
- 2007, Won both 'Director's Choice Award' and 'Excellence in Filmmaking' at Sedona International Film Festival
- 2007, Won Golden Glibb for 'Best Short Film' at Weekend of Fear, Nuremberg, Germany
