= A Piece of Sky =

A Piece of Sky may refer to:

- A Piece of Sky (1980 film), a Soviet Armenian film
- A Piece of Sky (2002 film), a French-Belgian film
- A Piece of Sky (2022 film), a Swiss-German film by Michael Koch
- "A Piece of Sky", a song from the musical Yentl, written by Michel Legrand with lyrics by Alan and Marilyn Bergman
- "A Piece of the Sky", a song from the 2012 album The Seer by American experimental rock band Swans
- "Piece of Sky", a song by the Wonder Stuff from the album Hup, 1989
