= Iljine =

Iljine is a surname, eg. a romanised form of Russian: Ильин. Notable people with the surname include:

- Diana Iljine (born 1964), German communication scientist, director of Filmfest München
- Nicolas Iljine (born 1944), French and Russian author, editor, curator, and art consultant
