= Dissonance (film) =

- film poster
- Directed by: Till Nowak
- Written by: Till Nowak
- Produced by: Till Nowak
- Narrated by: Leslie Barany (English); Mirko Thiele (German)
- Cinematography: Ivan Robles Mendoza
- Edited by: Philipp Hahn; Till Nowak
- Music by: Olaf Taranczewski; Frank Zerban
- Production companies: FrameboX; Detailfilm
- Distributed by: KurzFilmAgentur Hamburg
- Release date: 9 February 2015 (Berlin International Film Festival)
- Running time: 17 minutes
- Country: Germany
- Languages: German; English

Dissonance is a 2015 German short film by German digital and visual artist, graphic designer and filmmaker Till Nowak. It is a hybrid film that combines live action with animation.

== Background ==
The film's animations were created mainly using 3ds Max and After Effects. Nowak personally created all images and the fantasy world, with assistance from CG artist, Malte Lauinger, who created the final character models and rigs, and animated about half of the character motion." The live action shooting took two months of work and, after five years of developing and designing the processes, two years were spent with animation. All animation was hand done and used no motion-capture, thus designed to be the "soul" of the film and containing "most of the innovation and finesse". The live action segments were set to act as the film's counterpart, leading viewers from animation to reality and back. Nowak grants that creating his protagonist's hair "was one of our most difficult tasks", and done using 3ds Max’s “Hair & Fur” tool. Some of the hair treatment was performed by CG artist Gunter Freese using Maya and HairFx. Rendering took a full year with five computers running around the clock, but as rendering was subsequent to animation, Nowak would begin animating his next shot during rendering of the previous.

== Plot ==
In a surreal, floating animated world, a genius musician (Roland Schupp) lives a lonely life, and every day plays a tube-shaped piano in a huge and empty concert hall. As it spins, his fingers tickle the keys filling the air with beautiful music. One strange day his animated world begins to collapse and reality breaks out. During the transformation from an animation into live action, the musician has but one singular wish: to play for his daughter (Hannah Heine). In the reality, the daughter spies her father in the street below and the Mother (Nina Petri) warns her away from the window. The daughter expresses worry that the police might return, and the mother cautions that her father is not as might be wished.

In the streets, the musician tries to encourage interest in his works, but is continually rebuffed. He views traditional pianos in a music shop window and in looking over his reality is saddened and faints. Being examined in the hospital, the Doctor (Klaus Zehrfeld) explains that he is suffering from a common delusional fantasy called "Spherical Dissonance", and that he should escape it and embrace reality. Leaving the hospital, the musician sees the dissonance trying to re-emerge.

While the Mother speaks on the phone about how a restraining order is proving useless, the daughter leaves the home and approaches her musician father as he sits on the sidewalk outside. She sneaks him into the home and he begins to play for her on the home's traditional piano. The mother hears and confronts the musician. He nails a music box to the piano and leaves the home. Outside, he momentarily re-embraces his spherical dissonance before stepping sadly into reality.

== Cast ==
- Roland Schupp as Pianist
- Nina Petri as Mother
- Hannah Heine as Daughter
- Klaus Zehrfeld as Doctor
- Ralf Gogolin as Policeman
- Ottokar Reimann as Piano Salesman
- Leslie Barany as Narrator (English)
- Mirko Thiele as Narrator (German)

== Recognition ==
Scott Thill of Cartoon Brew called the film "stunning", writing that it was "a brilliantly speculative but also quite personal exercise" and that the film is "Evocative of Christopher Nolan’s surreal Inception, as well as Michel Gondry’s sci-fi standout, Eternal Sunshine of the Spotless Mind. Cameron Meier of Orlando Weekly called it "the best short film I've ever seen" and "a jaw-dropping blend of animation and live action that is pure cinematic genius."

=== Partial awards and nominations ===
- 2015, Won 'Jury Award' Grand Prix at Anima Mundi Animation Festival
- 2015, Won 'Best Original Music Award for a Short Film' at Annecy International Animated Film Festival
- 2015, Won Prix UIP Berlin at Berlin International Film Festival for Till Nowak
- 2015, Won Audience Award for 'Best Animated Short Film' at Fancine Festival de Cine Fantastico de la Universidad de Malaga
- 2015, Won 'Best Animation' at Aspen Shortsfest International
- 2015, Won Deutscher Filmmusikpreis (German Film Music Award) for 'Best Music in a Film' at German Film Score Awards
- 2015, Won Don Quixote Award at Krakow Film Festival
- 2015, Won Best International ShortWork Award for 'Best International Shortfilm' at Whistler Film Festival
- 2015, Won VFX Award for 'Best Visual Effects' at HollyShorts Film Festival
- 2015, nominated for Golden Berlin Bear for 'Best Short Film' by European Film Academy at Berlin International Film Festival
- 2015, nominated for 'Best Short Film' by Animago Awards
- 2015, nominated for 'Best Short Film' at Edinburgh International Film Festival
- 2015, nominated for European Film Award for 'European Short Film' at European Film Awards
- 2016, Won SAE Qantm Award for 'Best Use of Digital Technology in a Short Film' at Flickerfest International Short Film Festival
- 2016, nominated for 'Best Animated Short Subject' at Annie Awards
