= Sebastian Fritzsch =

German film director, photographer, screenwriter and visual artist

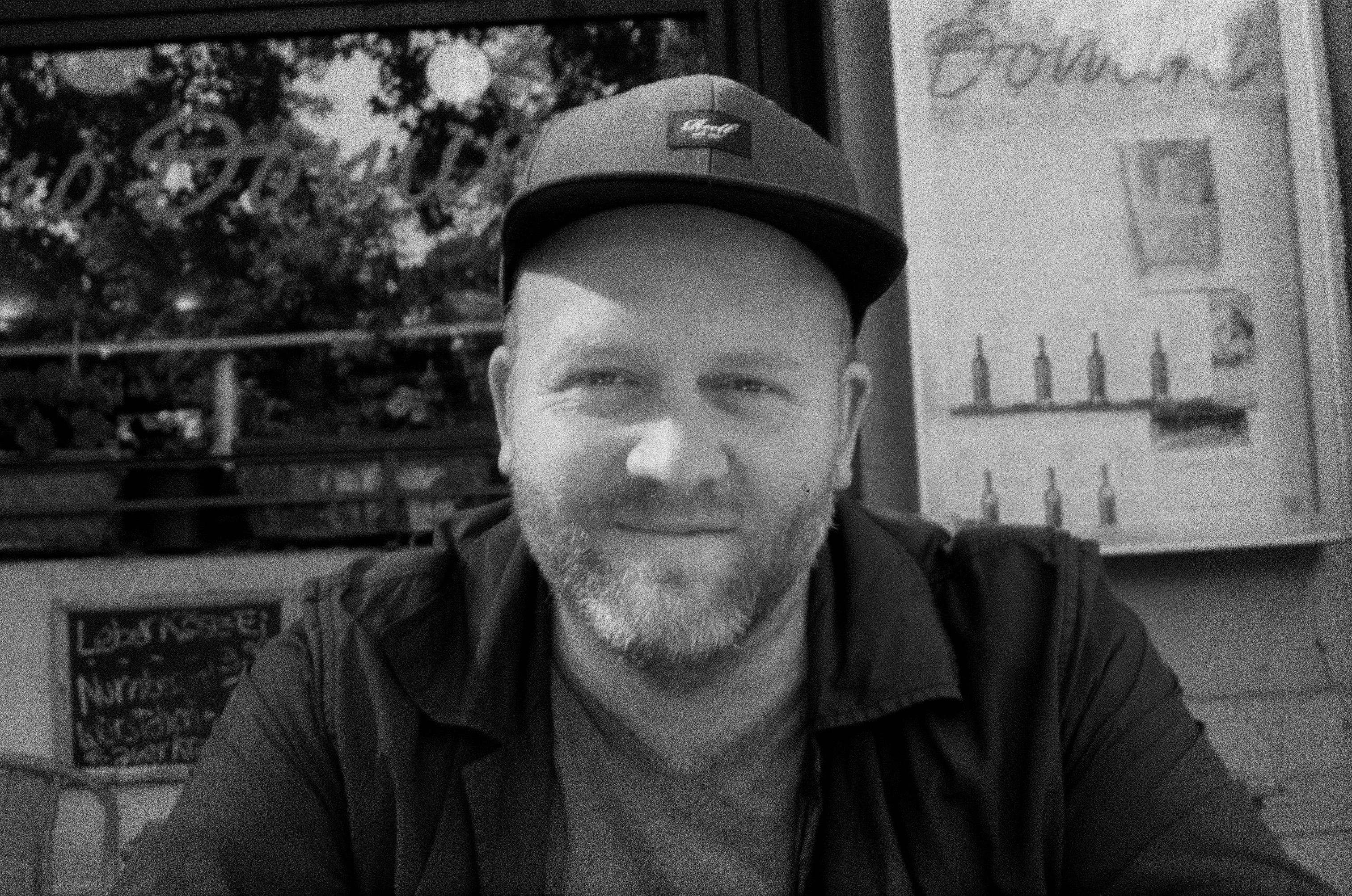
- Born: 20 May 1977 (age 49); Cologne, West Germany
- Occupations: Film director, photographer, screenwriter and visual artist

Sebastian Fritzsch (born 20 May 1977 in Cologne) is a German film director, photographer, screenwriter and visual artist.

== Biography ==
Fritzsch first studied cultural and theater studies at the Humboldt University in Berlin, before studying photography at the Academy of Fine Arts Leipzig from 2002. After a six-month internship at the Theater an der Ruhr, Fritzsch began studying at the Academy of Media Arts Cologne in 2003, specializing in film directing and photography. During his studies in Cologne, Fritzsch made a lot of short films and held several photo exhibitions. He graduated in 2009 with the narrative short film Traces (Spuren) and a photographic work as his diploma thesis. In the same year, Traces was shown at the 43rd Hof International Film Festival.

In 2010, Fritzsch moved into a studio in the Kunsthaus Essen in Essen and has since worked with the media of painting, drawing, collage and sculpture in parallel to his film and photographic work. He has exhibited in various galleries and exhibition spaces in Berlin and North Rhine-Westphalia, where he presented his photographs, paintings, graphics, collages and objects. From 2012 to 2016, he also managed the exhibition program Totale at the venue Maschinenhaus Essen.

In 2013, Fritzsch's first feature-length film End of Time (Endzeit) premiered at the 63rd Berlin International Film Festival in the Perspectives on German Cinema (Perspektive Deutsches Kino) section. In the same year, the film celebrated its international premiere at the 18th Busan International Film Festival in South Korea, where End of Time was presented in the World Cinema section. This was followed in 2024 by Fritzsch's second feature film The Forest Within (Wald in mir), which was screened in the feature film competition at the Max Ophüls Film Festival in Saarbrücken.

Fritzsch lives and works in Cologne.

== Works (selection) ==
=== Filmography ===
- 2009: Traces (Spuren), '(short film), (director, screenwriter)
- 2013: End of Time (Endzeit), (feature film), (director, producer)
- 2016: Marija (actor)
- 2019: Stars above us (Sterne über uns), (feature film), (actor)
- 2024: The Forest Within (Der Wald in mir), (feature film), (director,)

=== Group exhibitions ===
- 2010: Sense of Wonder, Dortmunder U (Dortmund, Germany)
- 2018: LODGERS #15, Museum of Contemporary Art, Antwerp (Antwerp, Belgium)

=== Literature ===
- 2021: Kammer

== Awards ==
- 2013: 63rd Berlin International Film Festival – Nomination for the Dialogue en perspective award in the category Perspectives on German Cinema for End of Time
- 2024: 45th Filmfestival Max Ophüls Preis – Nomination for the award Max Ophüls Preis in the category Best feature film for The Forest Within
