= A Piece of Sky (2022 film) =

2022 Swiss-German romantic drama film directed by Michael Koch

- Poster
- German: Drii Winter
- Directed by: Michael Koch
- Written by: Michael Koch
- Produced by: Christof Neracher
- Starring: Michèle Brand; Simon Wisler; Josef Aschwanden; Elin Zgraggen; Daniela Barmettler; Daniel Imholz
- Cinematography: Armin Dierolf
- Edited by: Florian Riegel
- Music by: Tobias Koch; Jannik Giger
- Production companies: Hugofilm features Pandora Film Produktions; SRF Schweizer Radio und Fernsehen; ARTE
- Distributed by: New Europe Film Sales; Frenetic Films
- Release date: 14 February 2022
- Running time: 136 minutes
- Countries: Germany; Switzerland
- Languages: Swiss; German

A Piece of Sky (German: Drii Winter) is a 2022 Swiss-German romantic drama film written and directed by Swiss filmmaker Michael Koch. The film was set against the backdrop of Swiss Alps. The film was officially selected at 72nd Berlin International Film Festival. The film also earned special mention from the main competition jury for its screenplay during the Berlin International Film Festival.

It was selected as the Swiss entry for the Best International Feature Film at the 95th Academy Awards, but it was not nominated.

== Synopsis ==
The film revolves around the relationship between Marco (Simon Wisler) and Anna (Michele Brand) although Marco is an outsider whereas Anna is a native person. In a remote Alpine village, Marco comes as an outsider but was welcomed by the people for gaining reputation for his ability to work hard as he established himself as a reputed farmer. He subsequently falls in love with Anna who is a single mother as the latter lives with her daughter Julia. Marco and Anna decides to marry but things change dramatically as Marco is reportedly diagnosed with brain tumour.

== Cast ==
- Simon Wisler as Marco
- Michele Brand as Anna
- Elin Zgraggen
- Daniela Barmettler
- Josef Aschwanden

== Production ==
The film project marked Michael Koch's second feature film directorial after Marija (2016). The filmmaker began shooting and principal photography for the film in early 2020s. The filming was disrupted on several occasions due to the impact of the COVID-19 pandemic.

Filmmaker Koch roped in non professional actors for his directorial venture. Simon Wisler who played the male lead role is in fact a real life mountain farmer who works in Switzerland. The portions of the film were predominantly shot in Kanton Uri in Switzerland. The film is a Swiss-German collaboration as it was jointly produced by Hugofilm Productions, Pandora Filmproduktion, SRF - Schweizer Radio und Fernsehen, SRG SSR and ARTE Deutschland. The worldwide international distribution rights were sold to New Europe Film Sales.

== Premiere ==
The film was premiered in the international competition on 14 February 2022 coinciding with the Valentine's Day at the 2022 Berlin International Film Festival.

The film was premiered in Horizons category at the 56th Karlovy Vary International Film Festival. It was also screened in Swiss panorama section at the 75th Locarno Film Festival. It was also officially chosen for film premiere at the 2022 Leeds New Directors Competition. It was also screened at the 2022 Chicago International Film Festival.

== Reception ==
=== Critical response ===
A Piece of Sky has an approval rating of 92% on review aggregator website Rotten Tomatoes, based on 13 reviews, and an average rating of 7.4/10.

=== Accolades ===
The film received several nominations and awards at several international film festivals.

The film was nominated for Golden Firebird Award in Young Cinema category at 2022 Hong Kong International Film Festival. The film was adjudged as the Best International Feature Film at the 2022 Guanajuato International Film Festival. The film also received nomination in Cinema Extraordinaire category at the 2022 Bergen International Film Festival. The film also gained recognition at the 2022 São Paulo International Film Festival after being nominated for Best Film in New Directors Competition. The film won the TRT Award in the First Cut+ category at the 2021 Karlovy Vary International Film Festival.

The film notched up the Silver Alexander award in International Competition category at the 2022 Thessaloniki Film Festival while the film also was nominated for Golden Alexander in International Competition category during the 2022 Thessaloniki Film Festival. It also received nomination for Louve d'Or award for the Best Film during the 2022 Festival du nouveau cinéma. The film also received nomination for Carmel Award in Best International Film category at the 2022 Haifa International Film Festival.

The film earned nomination in Best Film category at Film Fest Gent in 2022, and won the Georges Delerue Award for Best Music at Gent. The film also secured one of the nominees at the 2022 Motovun Film Festival in Best Film category. The film was also nominated for Gold Hugo award in the New Directors Competition at the 2022 Chicago International Film Festival. During the 2022 Chicago International Film Festival, it also bagged nomination for Roger Ebert Award in New Directors Competition.

The film also collected honours at the 2023 Swiss Film Awards including 6 nominations for Best Actress, Best Actor, Best Screenplay, Best Music and Best Sound categories and won the Best Film award.

The film also won the main award as Best Film at the Festival Augenblick, a French film festival for German-language films.

== See also ==
- List of submissions to the 95th Academy Awards for Best International Feature Film
- List of Swiss submissions for the Academy Award for Best Foreign Language Film
