= Festival Augenblick =

The Festival Augenblick is a French film festival based in Strasbourg, held annually in the Grand Est region since 2005. It showcases German-language films.

== Profile ==
Taking place every November in Alsace and the Grand Est region, the festival focuses on German-language cinema. Founded in 2005 by the Alsace Cinémas association (now renamed Le RECIT), the festival aims to make films primarily from Germany, Austria, and Switzerland accessible to a wide French audience. It features both current films and classics, showcasing works from renowned filmmakers as well as emerging talents.

One of the festival's key objectives is to foster cultural exchange between German-speaking countries and France. It counts over 50,000 admissions annually and is held in more than 40 screening locations.

In addition to film screenings, the festival offers various side events, such as discussions, workshops, masterclasses, and film education programs. The current artistic director of the festival is Sadia Robein.

== Guests and awards ==
The festival features two main competition categories: Best Film and Best Short Film. The competition for Best Film includes the presentation of the Professional Jury Prize (endowed with €2,000), awarded by a jury of European film professionals. Amongst the winners have been films such as Drii Winter, Styx, Western, One Last Evening, Land of Mine, Amour Fou, Oray and The Wall.

The festival's honorary guests have included renowned names such as Daniel Brühl, Werner Herzog, Christian Petzold, Hanna Schygulla and Volker Schlöndorff.
