= Marija (film) =

2016 film

- Film poster
- Directed by: Michael Koch
- Written by: Michael Koch
- Starring: Margarita Breitkreiz
- Release date: 8 August 2016 (Locarno)
- Running time: 100 minutes
- Countries: Germany; Switzerland
- Language: German

Marija is a 2016 German-Swiss drama film directed by Michael Koch. It premiered at the Locarno Film Festival in Switzerland in 2016 and was screened in the Discovery section at the 2016 Toronto International Film Festival.

== Plot ==
Marija is a Ukrainian immigrant, who lives in Dortmund's Nordstadt, a migrant problem district. In her bathroom, water drips from the ceiling. She works as a poorly paid chambermaid in a hotel and dreams of having her own hairdressing salon. But that becomes a distant prospect, when she loses her job, because a colleague, also a migrant, blows the whistle on her petty thefts.

Marija doggedly approaches the Turkish landlord Cem, when he ruthlessly storms her flat to collect back rent, that Marija cannot afford. Cem promptly softens up and hires her for occasional help with other tenants for a fee, be it translating at an illegal doctor's appointment or filling out child benefit applications.

As an escort to a party, Marija meets Cem's business associate Georg, who immediately sees through their "paid" relationship. He woos her, who has studied and speaks good German as well as Russian, away from Cem for a delicate negotiation about a lucrative Russian building project. Marija proves to be both charming and hard-nosed, and the plan succeeds. Georg is impressed and increasingly makes private advances to Marija, which in turn touch her, while she coolly rejects Cem's offer of a holiday for two.

Georg, who has a criminal record, supports Marija morally and with money in her dream of owning a hair salon. A little joy and happiness glimmer in her. But after a moonlighting inspection, which Marija barely escapes, Georg ends up in prison again, which is a horror for him. He wants a clean slate. The stashed cash from the Russian construction project is to serve as bail for his release and he is already planning a new existence in Mallorca. Marija's commitment to the worker Igor, husband of Marija's pregnant friend Olga, whom she had arranged for and who has now been deported, is of no concern to him - and apparently neither is Marija's dream. When Olga gives up and Igor follows her back to Ukraine, Marija uses Georg's money to help them and to start the hairdressing salon.

In the end, Georg is released anyway and confronts Marija. She immediately offers him the rest of his money and decides almost without hesitation in favour of her independence with a hairdressing salon and against Georg, who leaves the shop hurt, angry and giving up his money.

== Cast ==
- Margarita Breitkreiz as Marija
- Georg Friedrich as Georg
- Sahin Eryilmaz as Cem
- Olga Dinnikova as Olga
- Georges Devdariani as Architekt
- Mark Zak as Buildung Owner
- Dmitri Alexandrov as Igor
- Sebastian Fritzsch as Security guard

== Reception ==
=== Critical response ===
James Lattimer of Cinema Scope Magazine had criticized films' artificial dialogue and its often overemphatic delivery. Bringing examples such as; “If you don’t screw them, they’ll screw you” or “Why don’t you look for a normal job?”, which he claims is a result of bad script.

=== Accolades ===
Locarno Film Festival 2016

- Nomination for the Golden Leopard in the category Best film for Michael Koch

Angers European First Film Festival 2017

- Mademoiselle Ladubay Award (Prize for Best Actress) in the category European feature films for Margarita Breitkreiz
- Jean Carmet Award (Prize for Best Actor) in the category European feature films for Georg Friedrich

Glasgow Film Festival 2017

- Nomination for the Audience Award for Michel Koch

Minneapolis–Saint Paul International Film Festival 2017

- Nomination for the Emerging Filmmaker Award for Michael Koch

Mons International Film Festival 2017

- Le Coup de cœur du Jury (Jury - Prize) in the Official Competition (feature-length films) for Michael Koch
- Le prix d'interprétation féminine (Prize for Best Actress) for Margarita Breitkreiz

Prague International Film Festival 2017

- Amnesty International Febio Fest Award in the category Best Film for Michael Koch

Riviera International Film Festival 2017

- Nomination for the Jury Prize in the category Best Director for Michael Koch
- Nomination for the Jury Prize in the category Best Actress for Margarita Breitkreiz
- Nomination for the Jury Prize in the category Best Actor for Georg Friedrich

Swiss Film Award 2017

- Nomination for the Swiss Film Award in the category Best Fiction Film for Michael Koch
