= Diana Iljine =

German film festival director

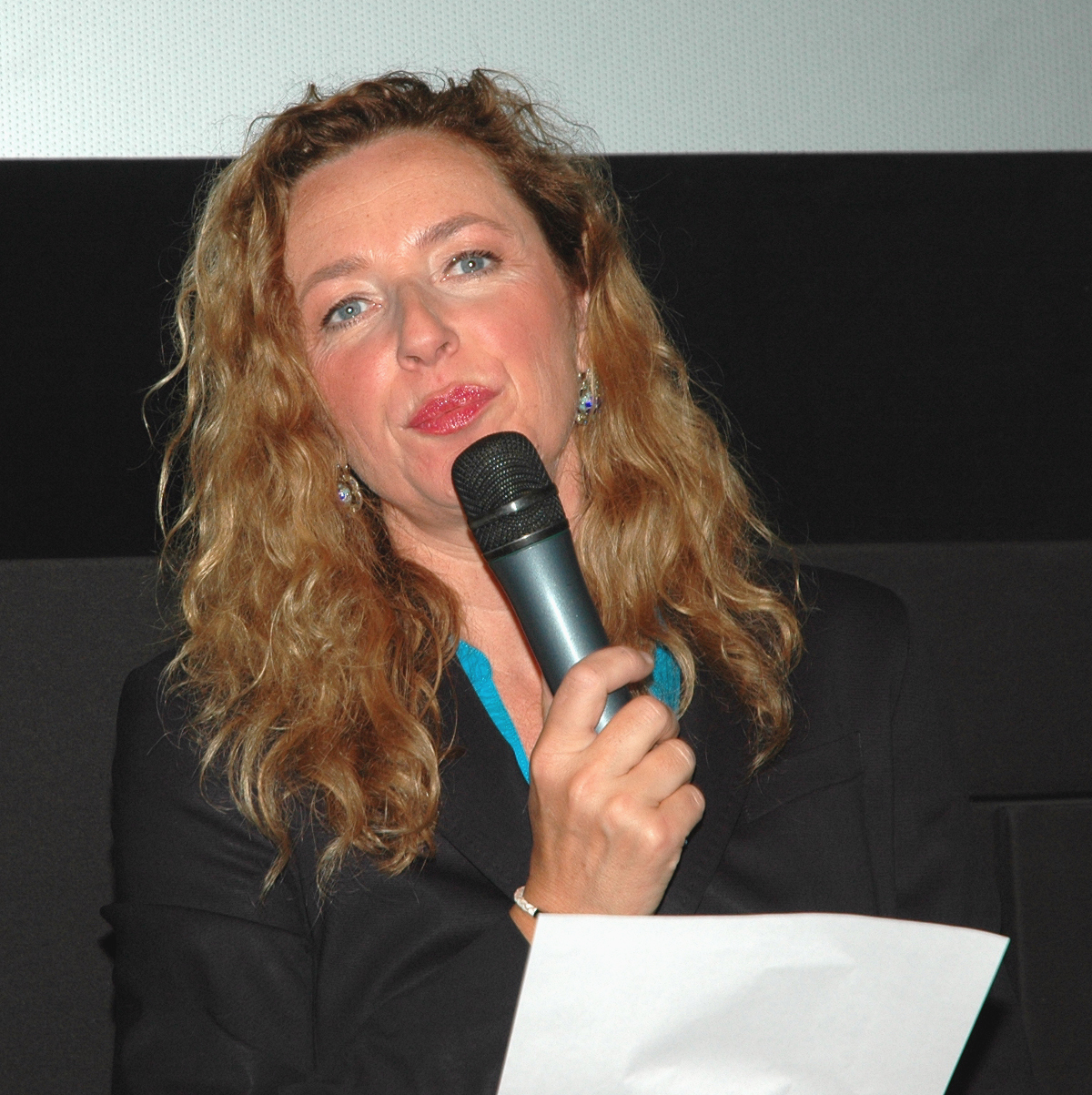
Diana Iljine

Diana Iljine (born September 13, 1964, in Frankfurt) is the director of Filmfest München, Munich's international film festival, and the Munich International Festival of Filmschools. She has held this post since August 2011 when she took over from Andreas Ströhl.

== Life and career ==
Born in Frankfurt, Iljine majored in communications at LMU Munich, then went on to work in film and TV for 25 years, mainly in sales and acquisitions. She has worked for ZDF, a public-service German television broadcaster and one of the biggest broadcasting organizations in Europe, as well as for Sky Deutschland (previously called “PREMIERE”). Iljine co-wrote a book on film production, “Der Produzent” (English: The producer), which became a standard reference work. In 2008, she went freelance as consultant for international licensing, co-productions and video on demand. She completed her MBA in 2011 at Berlin’s Steinbeis Business Academy and became head of FILMFEST MÜNCHEN in August 2011.

She had gathered experience at the festival in advance, having worked there for ten years as a student.

Aside from that, Diana Iljine sits on the board of the Kuratorium junger deutscher Film.
