= Prototype Museum (Hamburg) =

Museum in Germany

Coordinates: 53°32′36″N 10°00′09″E

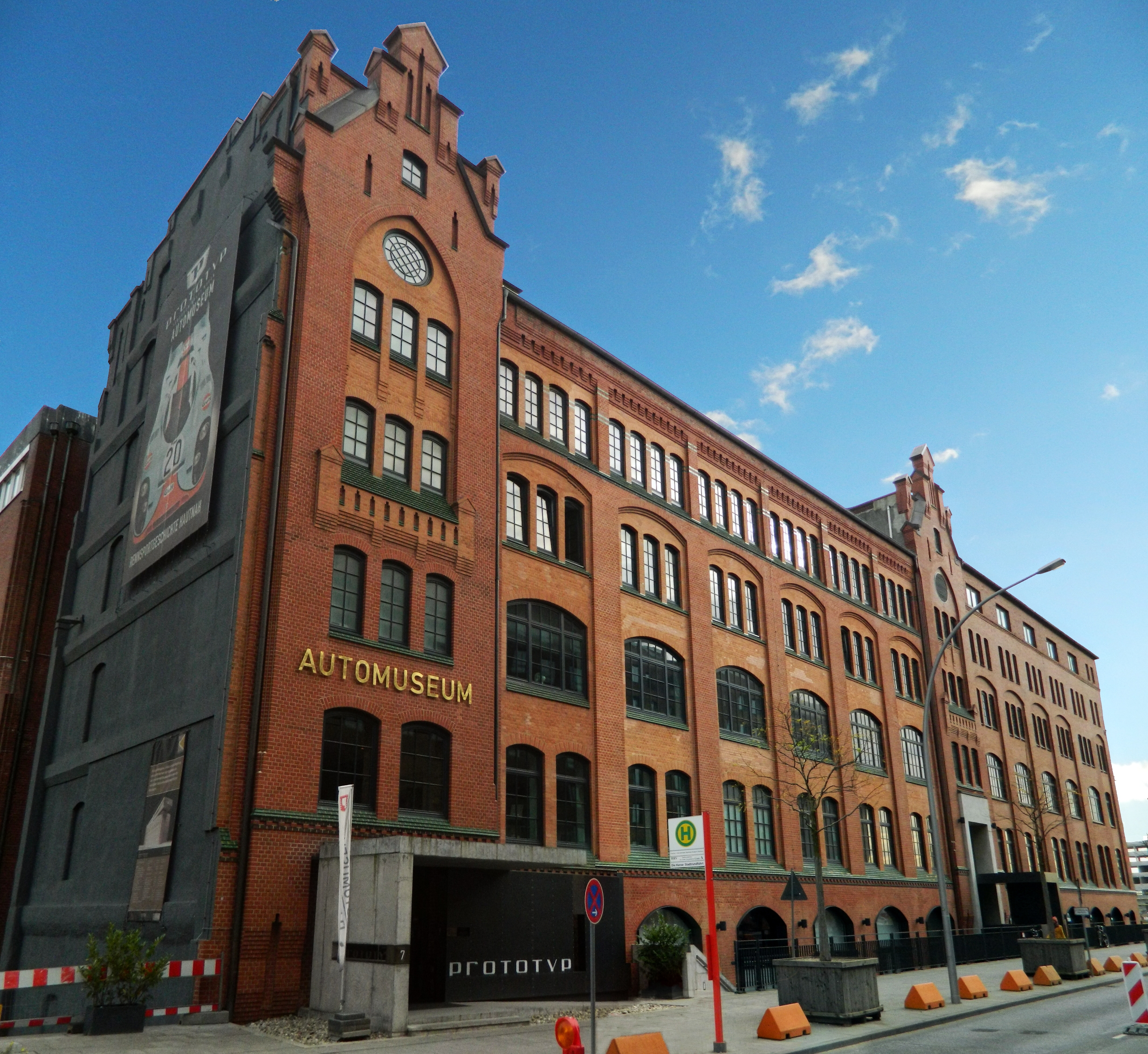
Automuseum PROTOTYP – Building

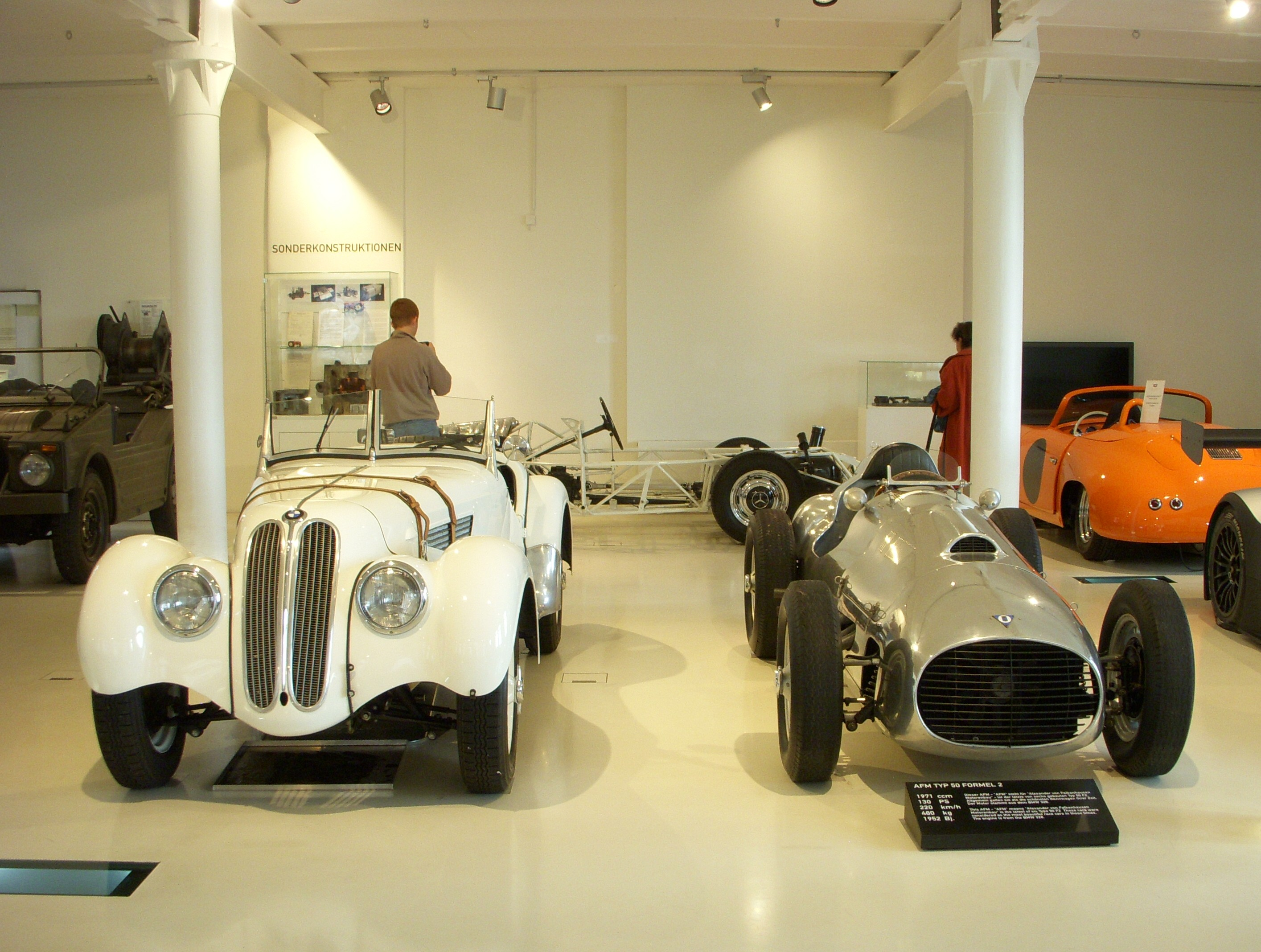
Inside the museum

The Prototyp – Personen.Kraft.Wagen (persons.power.cars) museum in Hamburg opened in 2008 (18 years ago) in Hamburg's Speicherstadt district. The permanent exhibition of the museum specializes in German sports and racing cars developed after WW II.

The PROTOTYP museum is privately funded and wants to convey excitement about cars by focussing the designers and race drivers like Otto Mathé and Petermax Müller who re-established racing after 1945. In many cases early race and sports cars in Germany were technically based on pre-war constructions like the Volkswagen. For that reason the PROTOTYP museum shows a special interest in this vehicle. In post-war racing unique self-built cars – prototypes – were designed and raced. These cars are here on display, together with other race and record cars, sports and even modern formula cars.

Display cabinets next to the cars show historic exhibits and offer informative stories. A digital library allows to leaf through the photo albums of race drivers and engineers. In a walk-in “Audiobox” several engine sounds can be started. A driving simulator is integrated in a real Porsche 356.

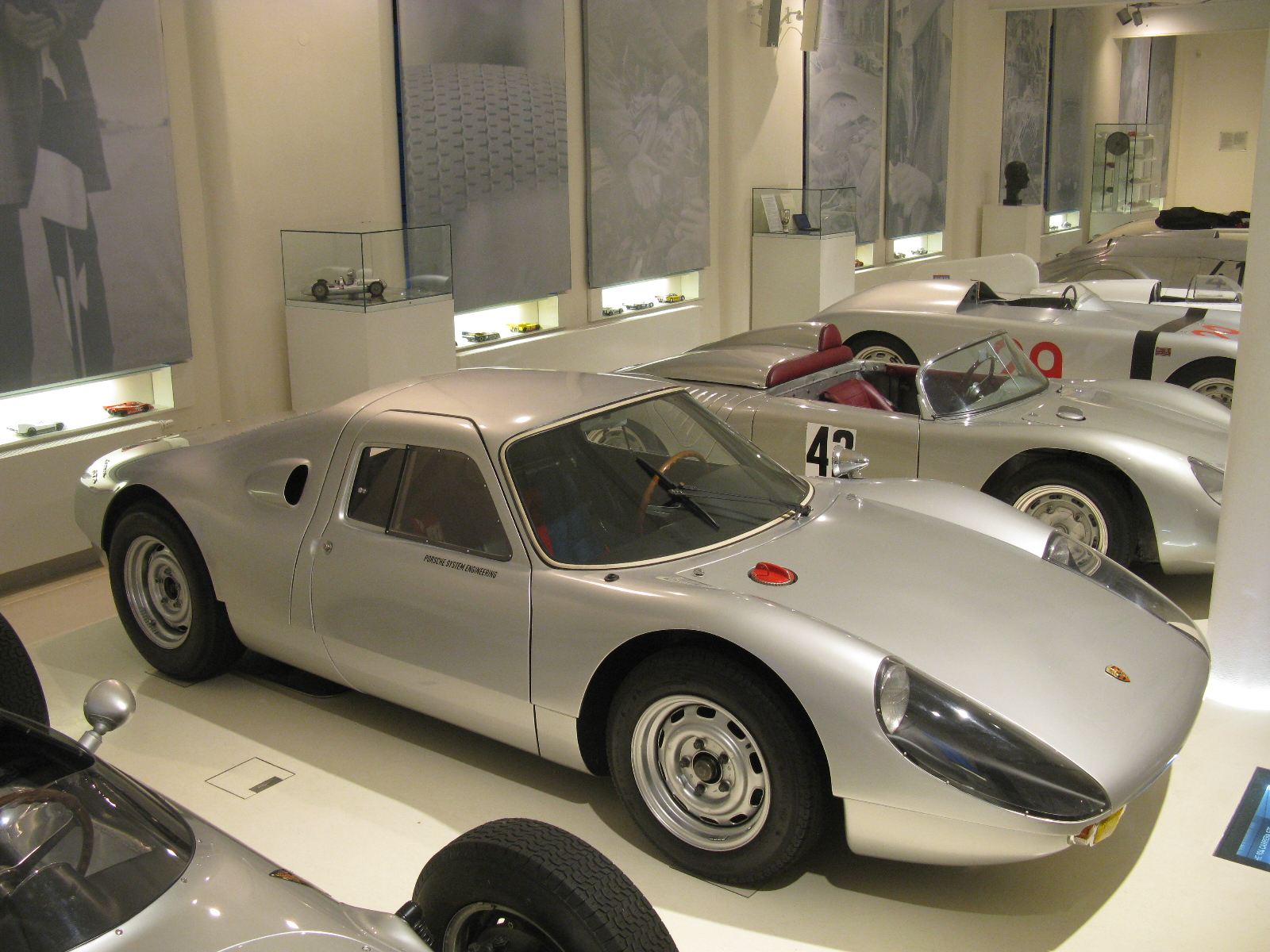

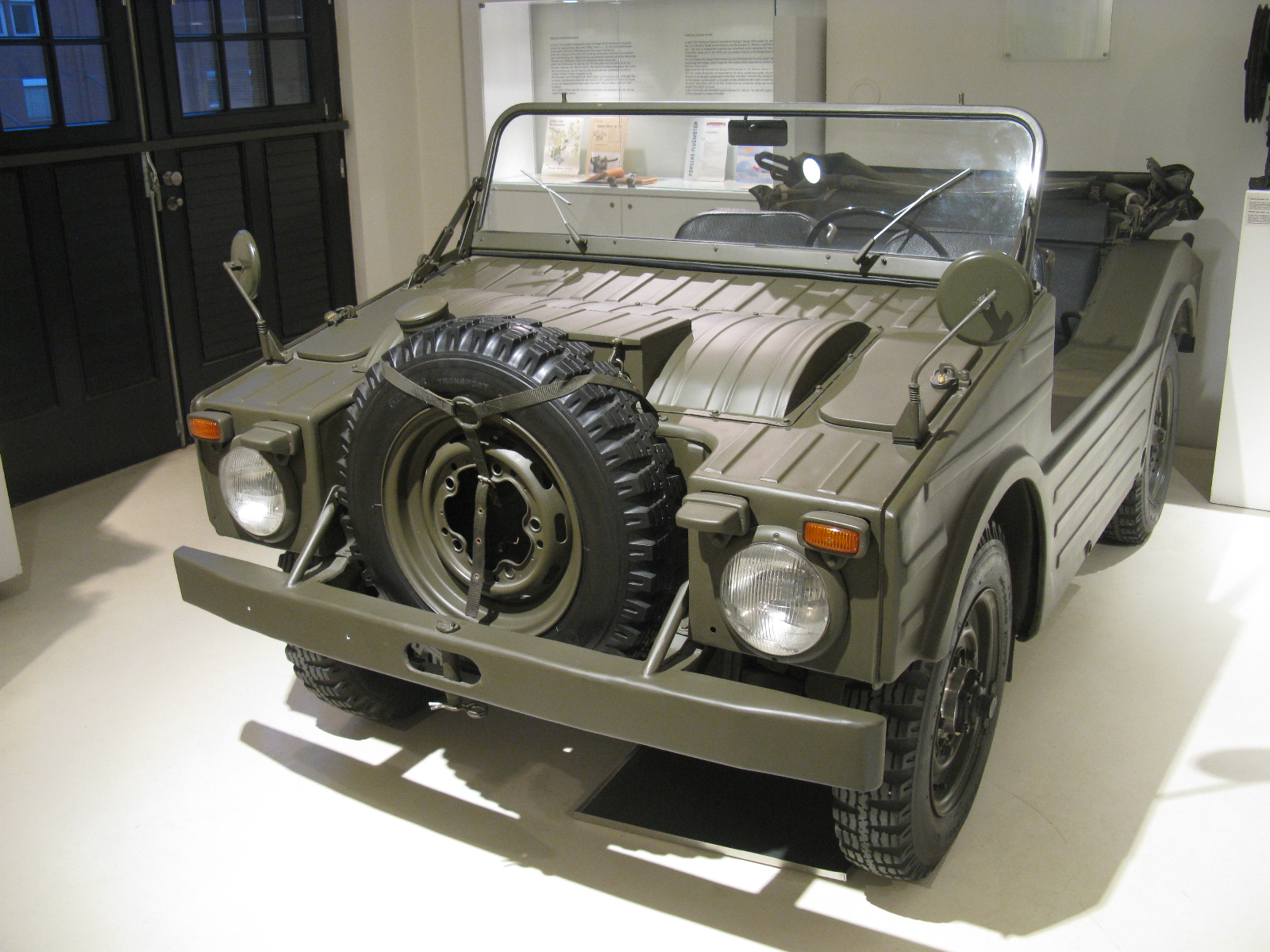

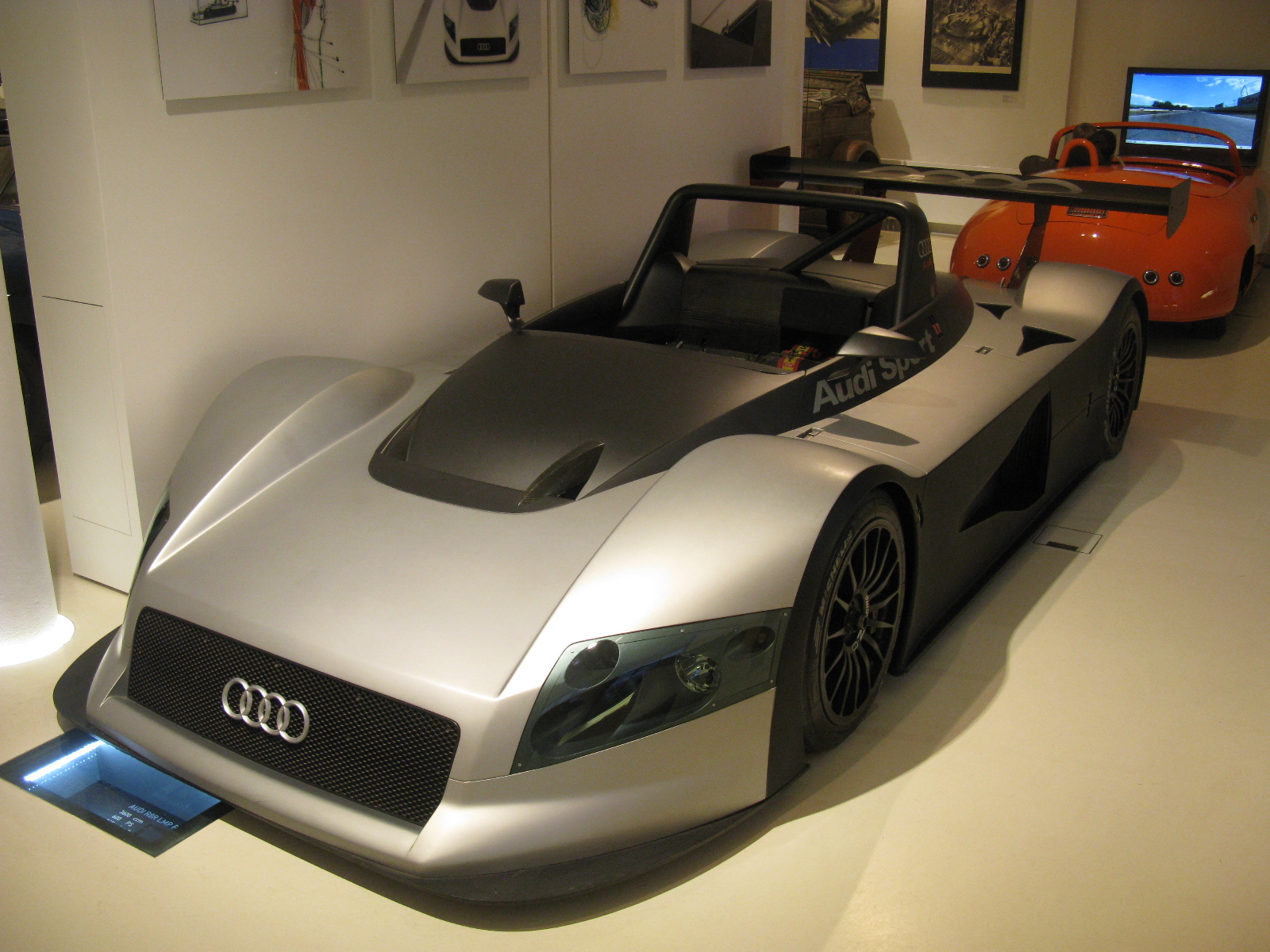

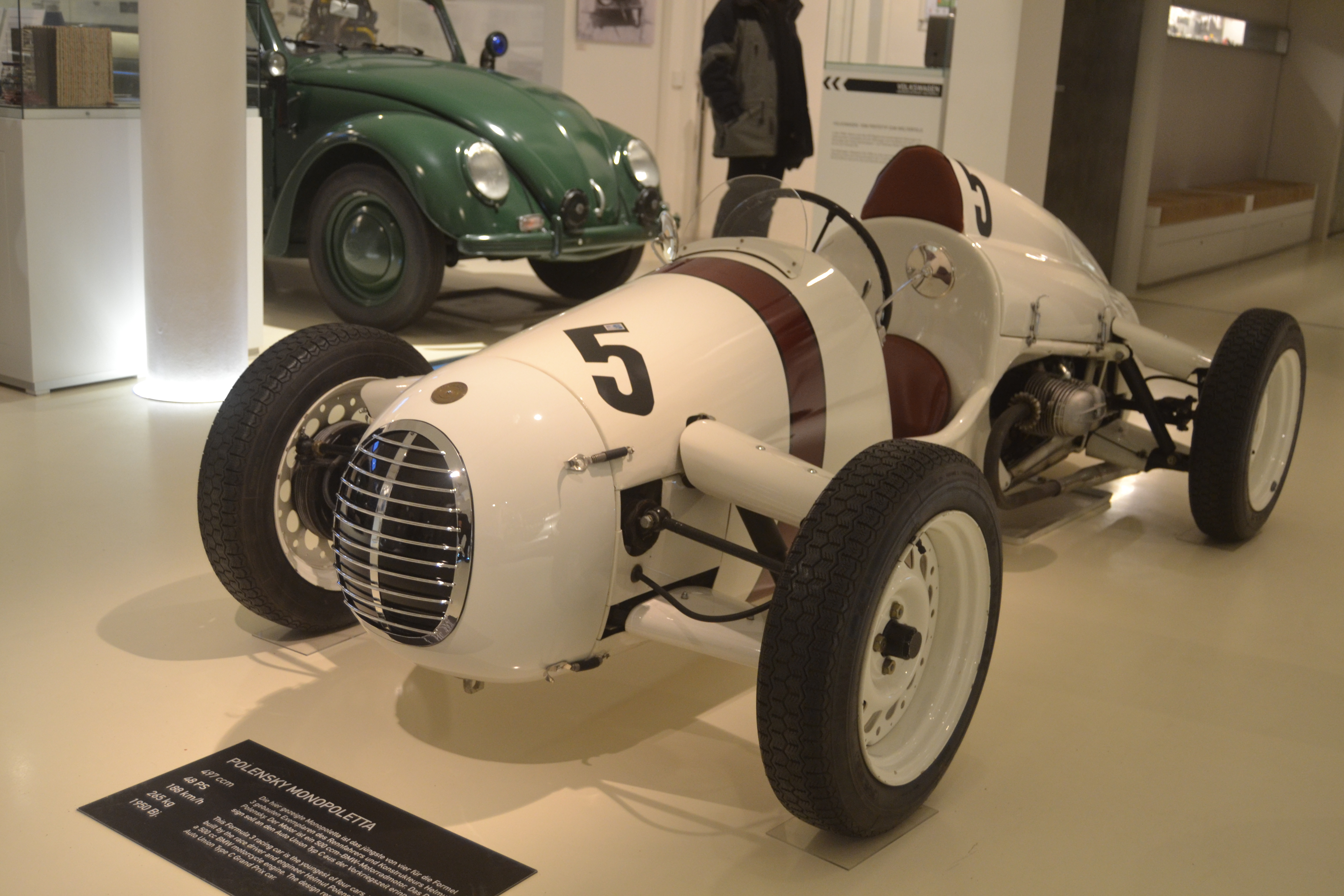

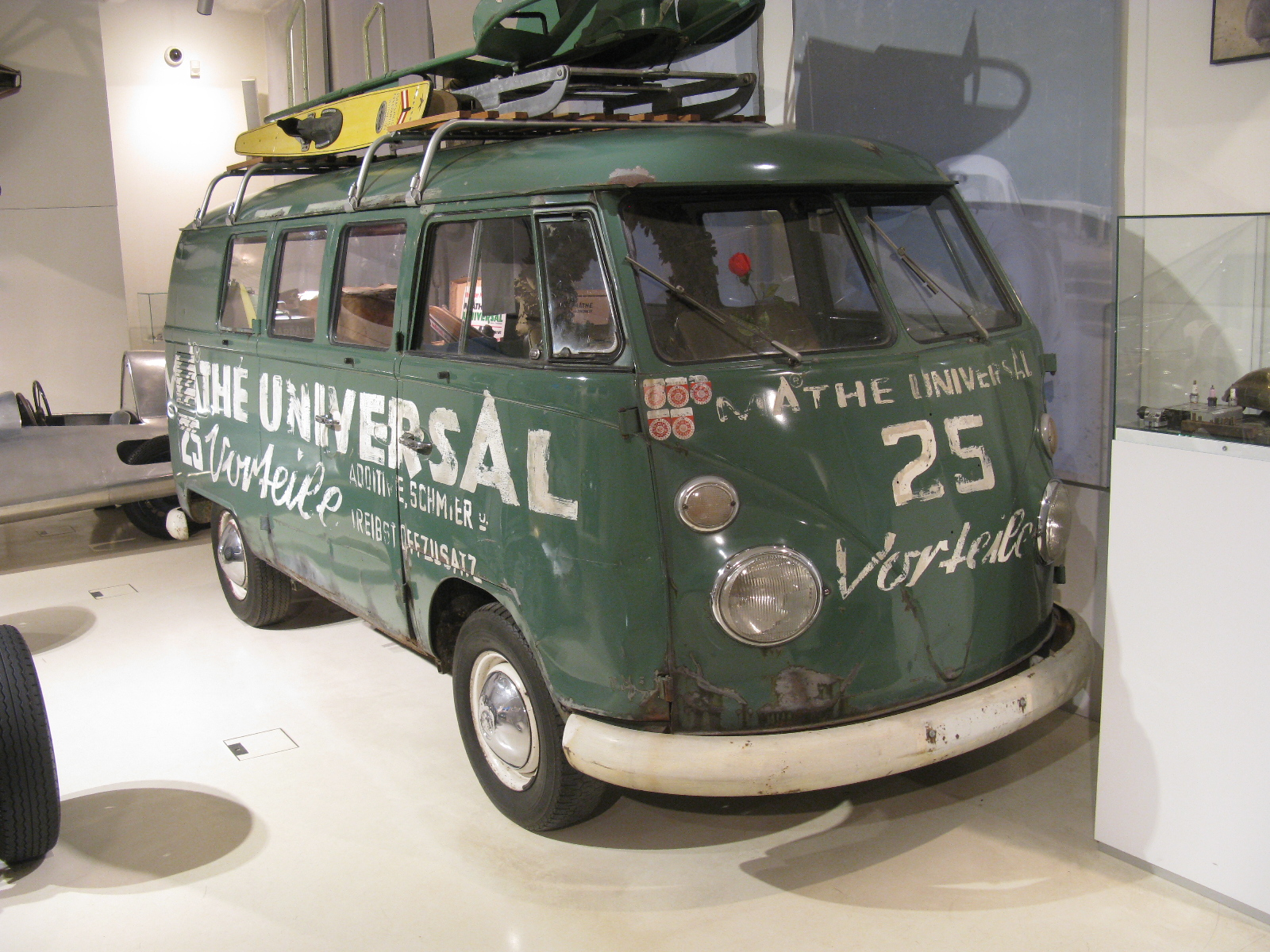

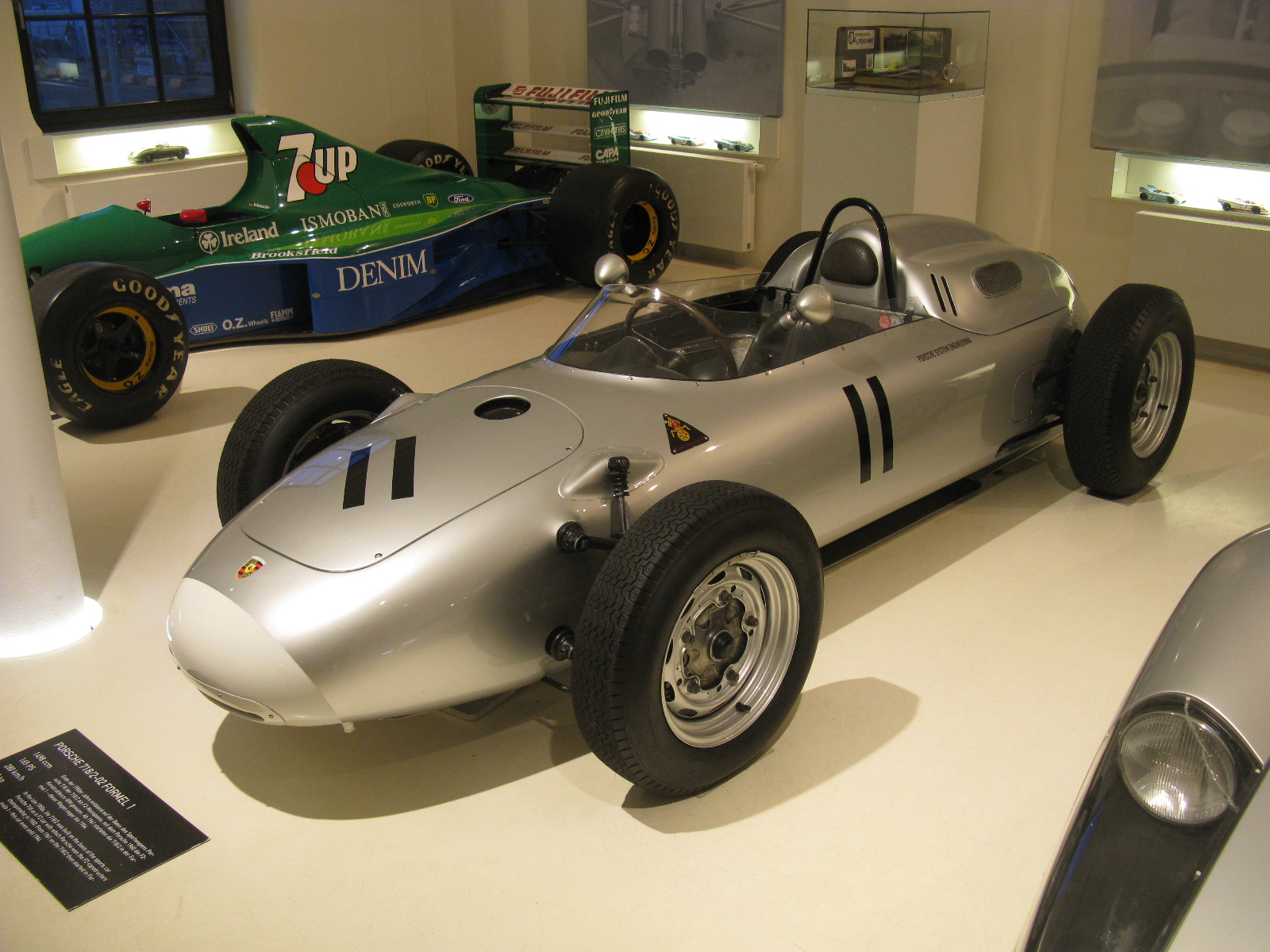

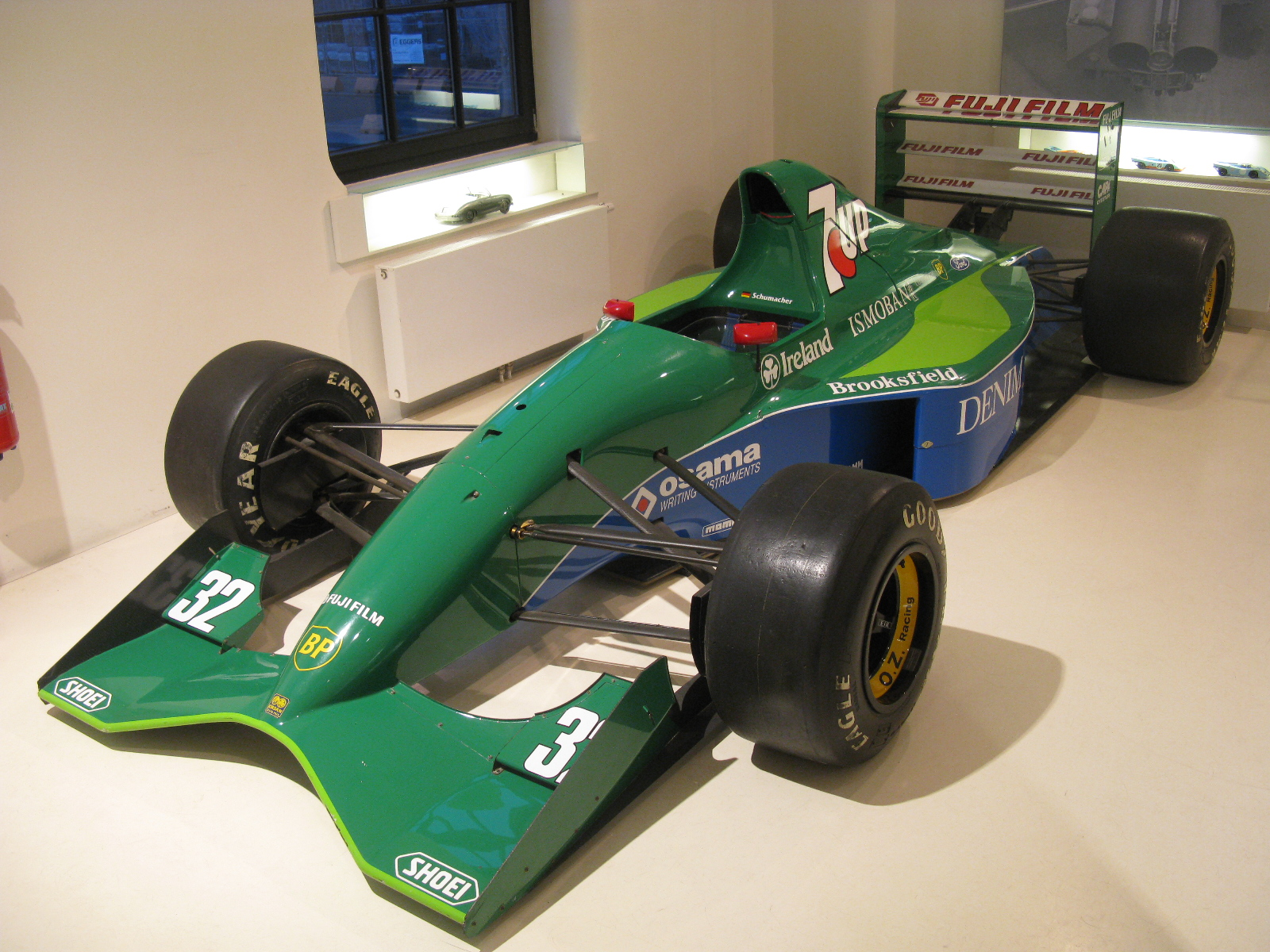

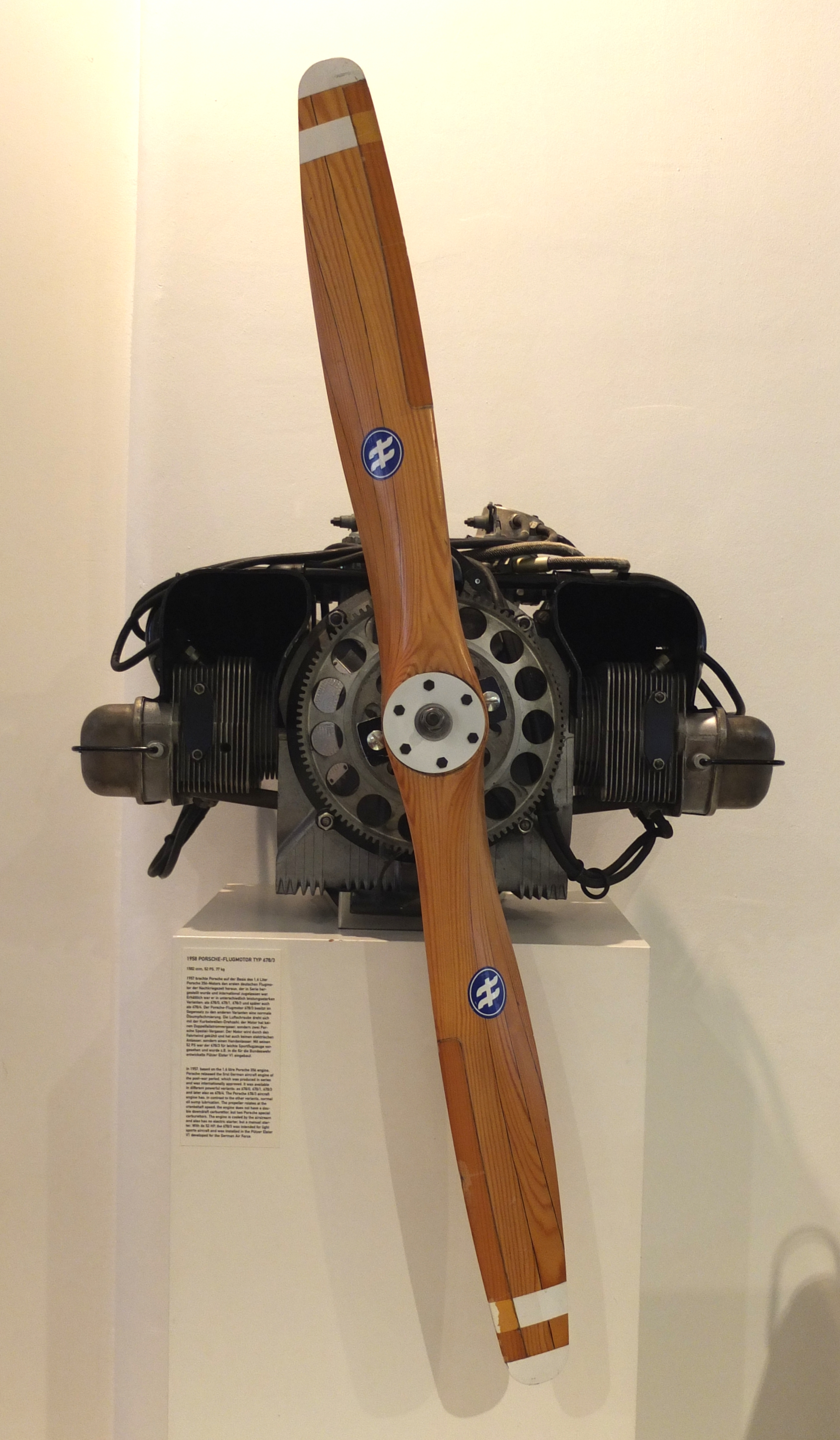

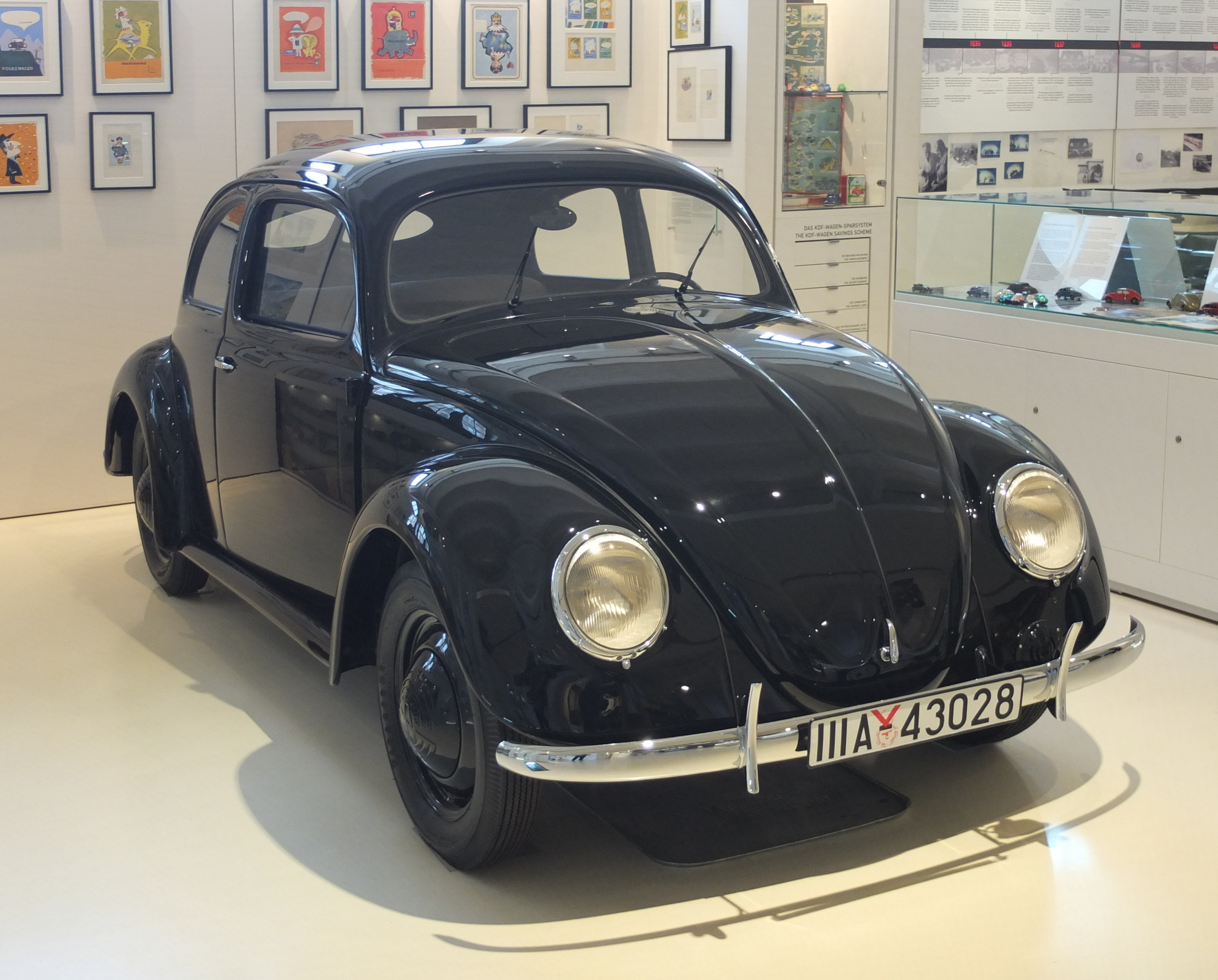
