= Filmfest München =

Film festival in Munich, Germany

Munich International Film Festival
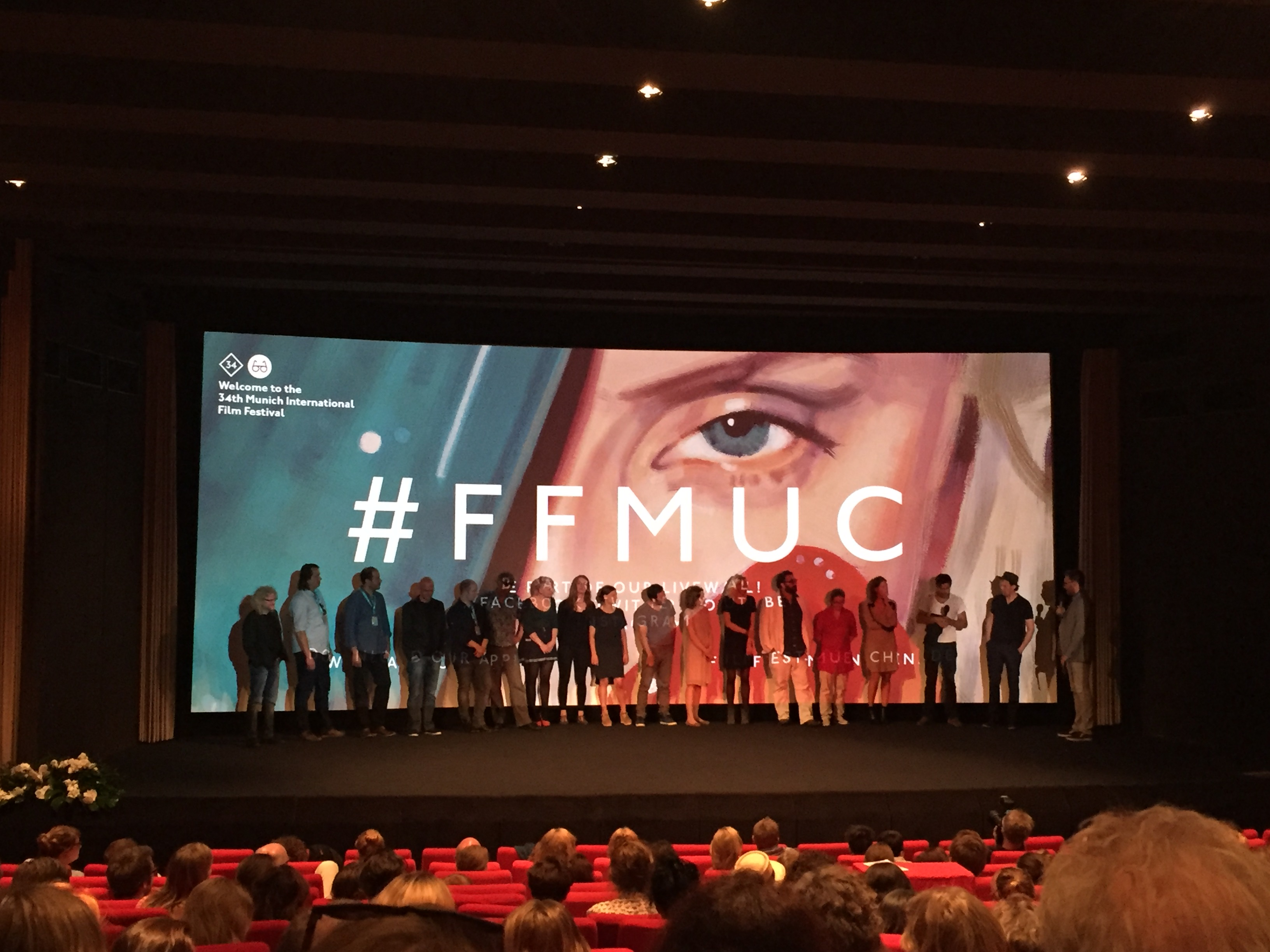
- A movie premiere at Filmfest 2016
- Location: Munich, Germany
- Founded: 1983
- Most recent: 2026
- Awards: German Cinema New Talent Award; ARRI Award; OSRAM Award; Bernd Burgemeister TV Movie Award
- Hosted by: Internationale Münchner Filmwochen GmbH
- Artistic director: Christoph Gröner, Julia Weigl
- No. of films: 200 per year
- Festival date: Opening: 26 June 2026; Closing: 5 July 2026
- Website: www.filmfest-muenchen.de

Current: 43rd
- 44th 41st

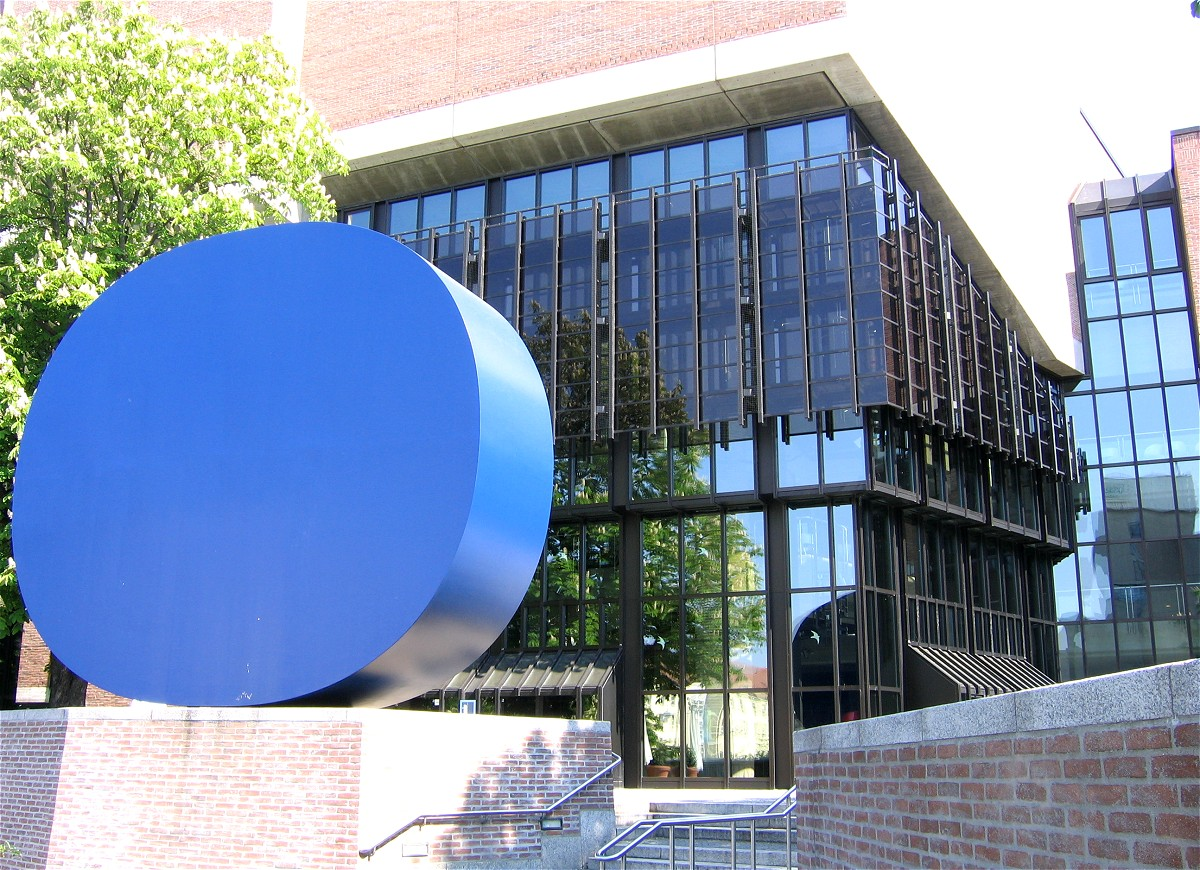
The Gasteig cultural center is the venue for the Filmfest

The Munich International Film Festival (German: FILMFEST MÜNCHEN) is the largest summer film festival in Germany and second in size and importance to the Berlinale. It is held annually since 1983 and takes place in late June or early July. It presents feature films and feature-length documentaries. The festival has identified emerging young filmmakers known for their talent and innovation, a practice that remains ongoing. With the exception of retrospectives, tributes and homages, all of the films screened are German, European and world premieres. There are a dozen competitions with prizes worth over €250,000 which are donated by the festival's major sponsors and partners.

The 42nd Munich International Film Festival took place from 27 June to 6 July 2025. It presented 164 films from 54 countries, including 141 premieres. Gillian Anderson an American actress, writer, and activist, was honoured with the CineMerit Award for her outstanding contributions to the art of film.

The 43rd Munich International Film Festival will take place from 26 June to 5 July 2026.

== Overview ==
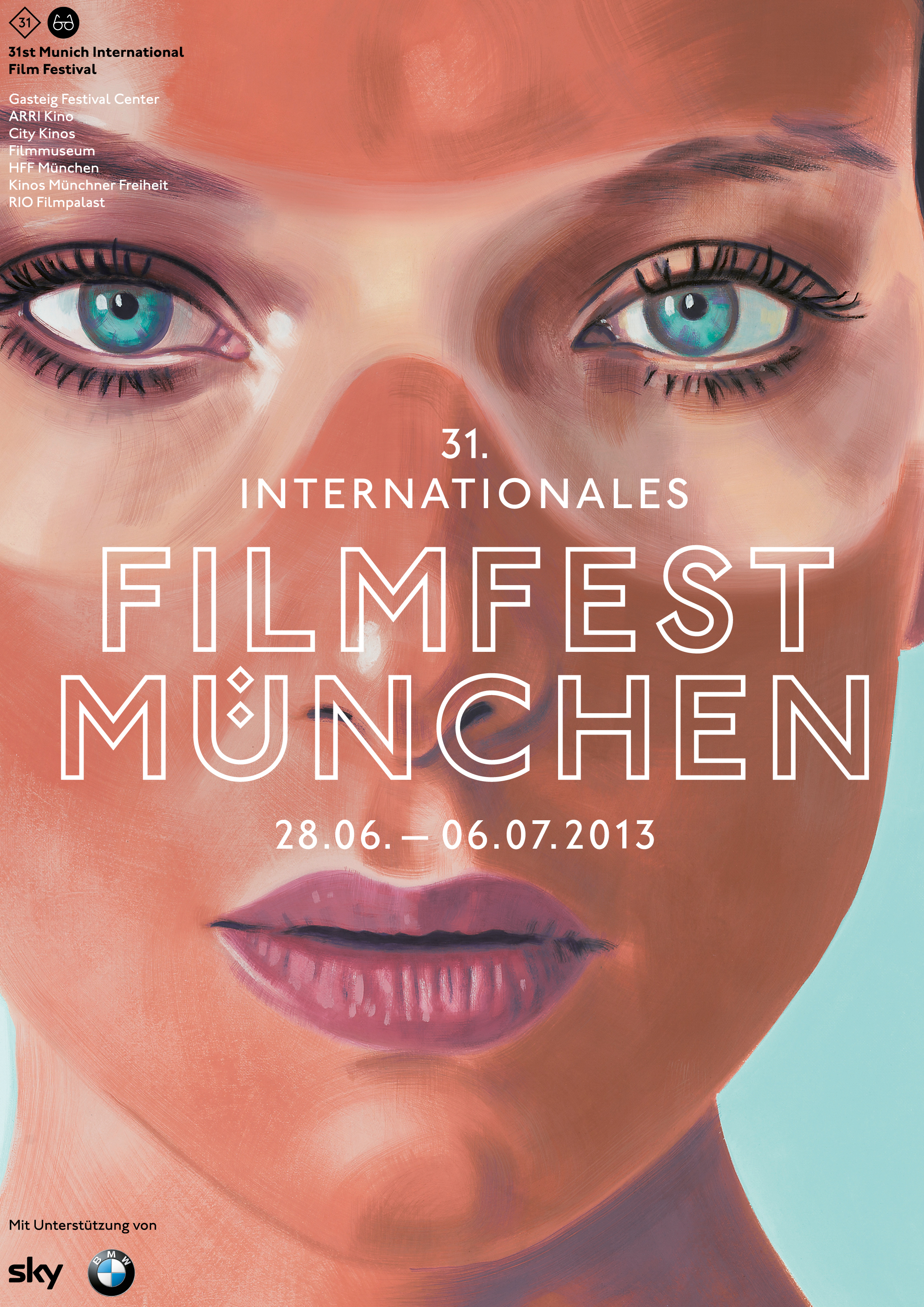
Poster of the Filmfest 2013

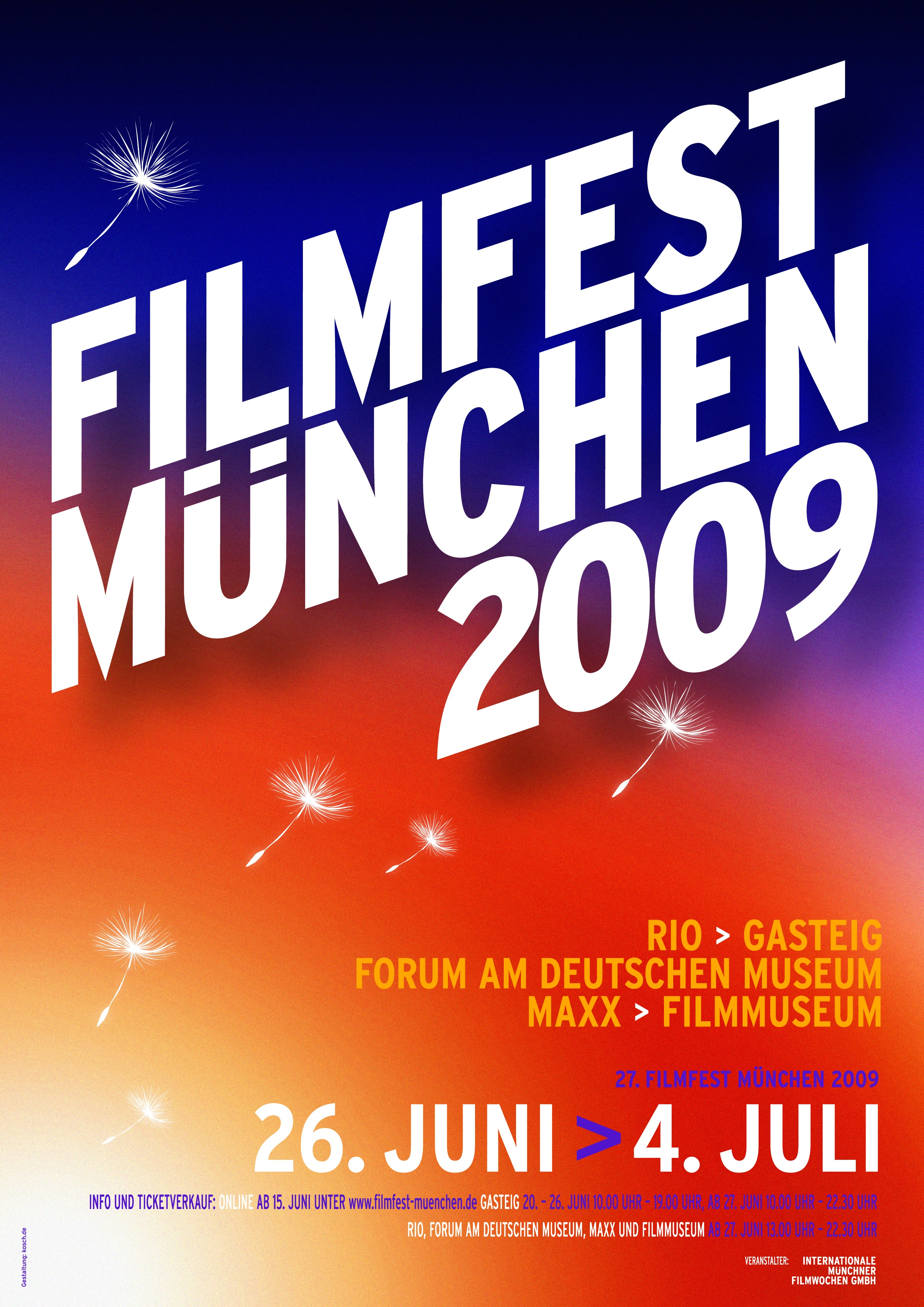
Poster of the Filmfest 2009

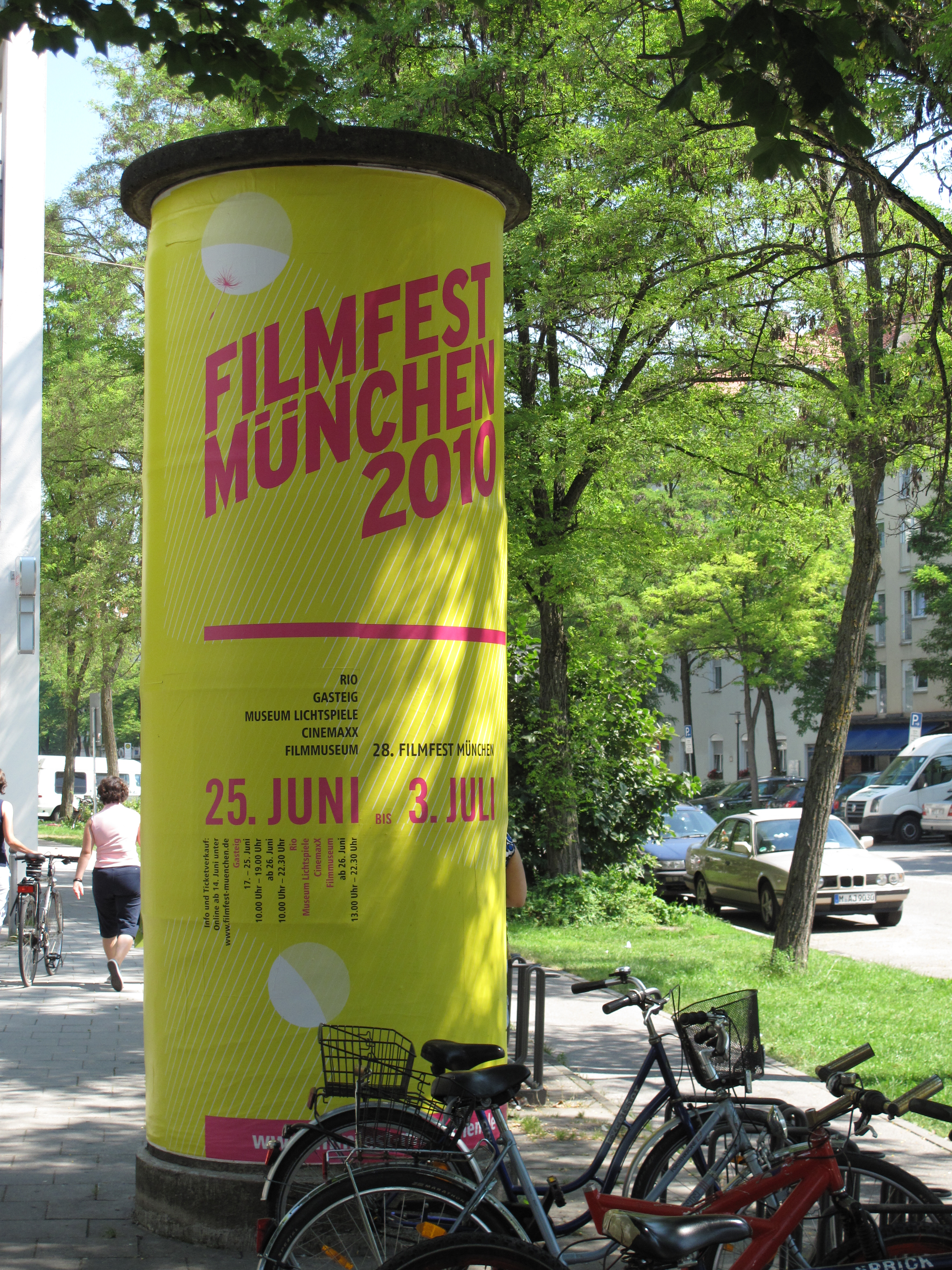
Advertising for the Filmfest

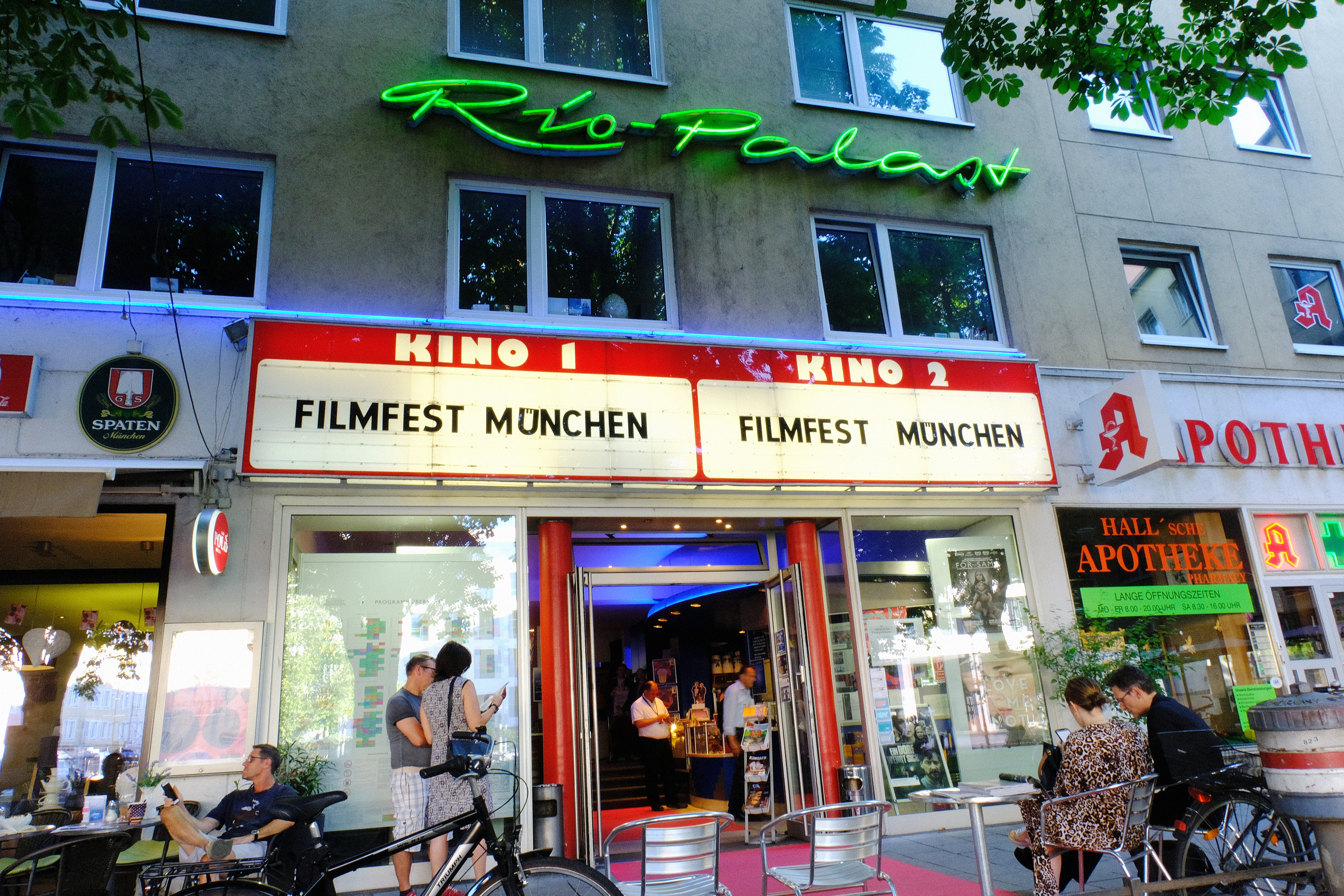
Rio cinema during the festival (2019)

With around 150 feature films and feature-length documentaries on more than 18 screens, FILMFEST MÜNCHEN has an annual attendance of around 80,000. It accredits more than 600 members of the international press and media as well as over 2,500 film industry professionals. It has always been a popular meeting place for industry insiders throughout Germany and Europe. The festival center is located in the Munich museums' district with locations at Amerikahaus and the TV and film University HFF where screenings, panels, ceremonies and discussions take place and the festival offices are located. There are several participating movie theaters in the downtown area.

The director of FILMFEST MÜNCHEN is Christoph Gröner. He took over from Diana Iljine, in 2022. Iljine herself took over in August 2011. Former directors are Andreas Ströhl (2004–2011) and Eberhard Hauff, who ran the festival from its outset. The festival is hosted by Internationale Münchner Filmwochen GmbH, whose shareholders are the City of Munich, the Free State of Bavaria (represented by State Minister of Finance Markus Söder), the Bayerischer Rundfunk (Bavarian Broadcasting, represented by Director Ulrich Wilhelm) and the SPIO (the German film industry association represented by Thomas Negele. The IMF also hosts the annual International Festival of Film Schools (German: Internationales Festival der Filmhochschulen München)/Festival of Future Storytellers in November.

== Sections and Sidebars ==
The festival's program ranges from lavish productions to No Budget Films. Special attention is placed on fostering talented young filmmakers from Germany and around the world.

The sections of the Filmfest München program are:

=== CineMasters Competition ===
This section includes films from internationally acclaimed directors (with the exception of Germany). The films are in competition for the ARRI/OSRAM Award for Best Film (non-German).

=== CineVision Competition ===
Innovative first and second-time films by up-and-coming directors from around the world compete for the CineVision Award for Best Film by a New Director (non-German).

=== CineCoPro Competition ===
German co-producers of international co-productions compete for the CineCoPro Award which is sponsored by FFF Bayern and comes with a prize of €100,000.

=== Spotlight ===
This section showcases stories that are larger than life - grand emotions, lavish production design, big names in front of and behind the camera, traditionally crafted movies by acclaimed, experienced directors as well as by outstanding, lesser-known filmmakers.

=== International Independents ===
The section focuses on new encounters with exciting filmmakers from around the world. Definitely not mainstream. Young, uncompromising cinema from the US, Canada, Latin America, Asia, Australia, Africa and Europe.

=== New German Cinema ===
The new productions in this section are all world premieres. Up and coming filmmakers vie for the German Cinema New Talent Awards in the categories Best Director, Best Production, Best Actor & Actress and Best Screenplay.

Many well-known German film directors such as Sönke Wortmann (Alone Among Women), Oskar Roehler (Silvester Countdown), Marcus H. Rosenmüller (Grave Decisions) and Rainer Kaufmann (Talk of the Town) launched their careers with the winning films of this section. Various Academy Award-nominated films such as Beyond Silence by Caroline Link and The Story of the Weeping Camel by Byambasuren Davaa and Luigi Falorni had their world premieres in this section.

=== New German TV Movies ===
This section features outstanding TV movies, all world premieres, which are in competition for the Bernd Burgemeister TV Movie Award.

=== Homage ===
The section Homage consists of sidebars that honor the work of a particular filmmaker:

==== Retrospectives ====
Screenings that represent a comprehensive or major part of the work of an internationally acclaimed filmmaker.

The retrospectives of famous filmmakers have included: Sergio Leone (1986), Im Kwon-taek (1990), Lars von Trier (1991), Hal Hartley (1992), Nagisa Ōshima (1992), Stanley Donen (1992), Nanni Moretti (1994), Michael Haneke (1994, 2009), Nelson Pereira (1995), Nicolas Roeg (1995), Robert Wise (1996), Ron Bass (1996), Roman Polański (1999), Miloš Forman (2000), Aki & Mika Kaurismäki (2004), Alan Parker (2004), Barry Levinson (2006), Mike Figgis (2006), Richard Linklater (2007), Werner Herzog (2007), Herbert Achternbusch (2008), Julie Christie (2008), Stephen Frears (2009), Ulrich Seidl (2010), Tom DiCillo (2011), Todd Haynes (2012), Alejandro Jodorowsky (2013), Walter Hill (2014), Alexander Payne (2015), Christian Petzold and Bahman Ghobadi (both 2016), Sofia Coppola (2017), Lucrecia Martel (2018), Bong Joon Ho and Mads Brügger (both 2019).

==== The CineMerit Award ====
The festival screens a selection of films in honor of the recipient, an outstanding personality in the international film community who has made extraordinary contributions to motion pictures as an art form. Previous recipients have included John Malkovich, Michael Haneke, William Friedkin, Julie Christie, Alan Parker, D.A. Pennebaker, Claude Chabrol, Susan Sarandon, Jules Dassin, Melanie Griffith and Michael Caine, Isabelle Huppert and Udo Kier, Jean-Jacques Annaud and Rupert Everett, Ellen Burstyn and Bryan Cranston, Emma Thompson and Terry Gilliam, as well as Antonio Banderas and Ralph Fiennes.

==== Tributes ====
Specials that, for reasons of current interest, honor a particular filmmaker or artist with a selection of films. Recent tributes: Rainer Werner Fassbinder, Julie Delpy, Nicolas Winding Refn, Willy Bogner and Philip Gröning.

=== CineKindl Award, previously known as The Kinderfilmfest ===
Since 1983, Filmfest München has screened the new feature films and shorts for kids (ages 4 and up) from around the world. Films that are enriching as well as entertaining. The children have the opportunity to vote for their favorite film to win the CineKindl Audience Award.

=== Open Air ===
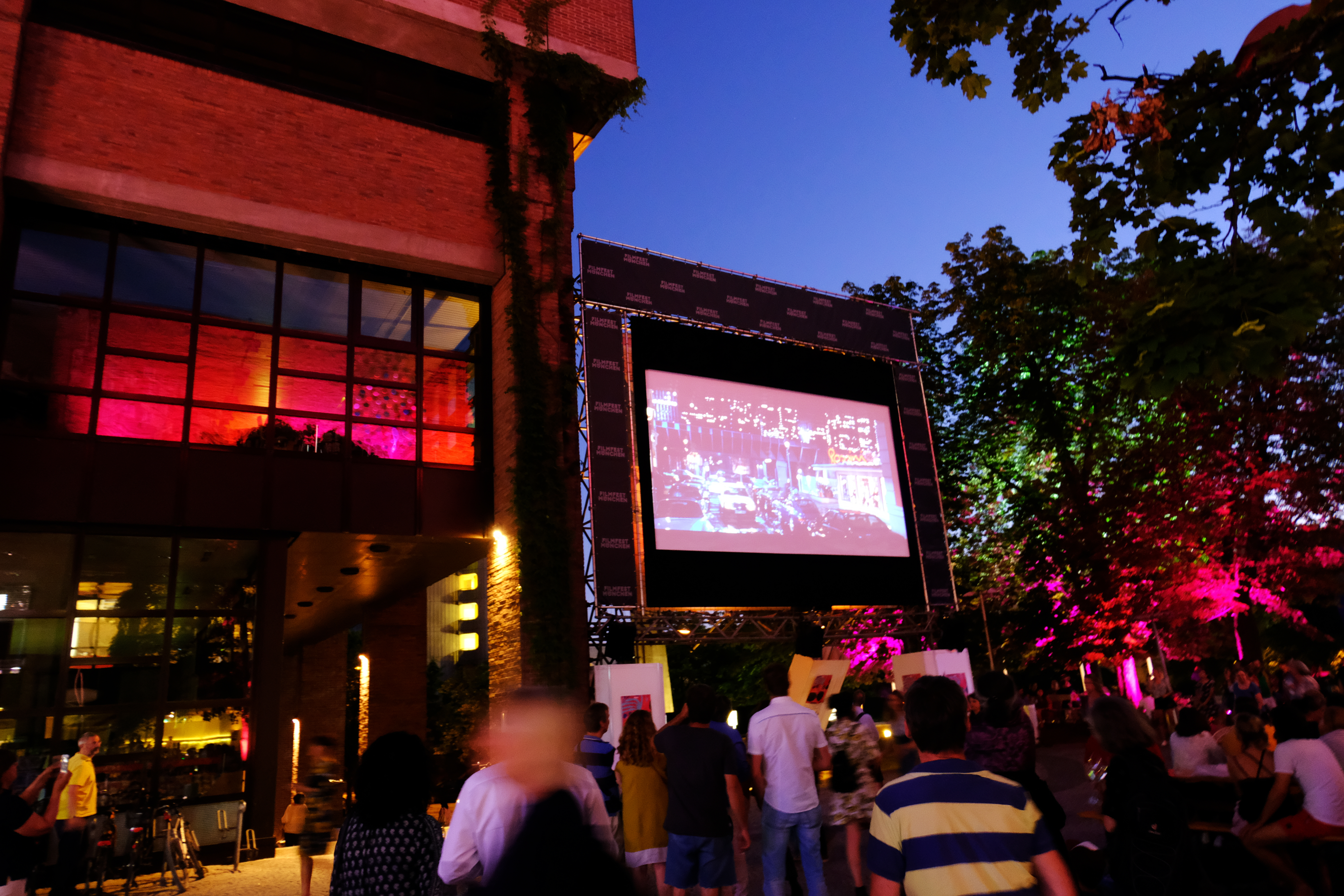
Open air projection of a Helmut Dietl film (2019)

Festival atmosphere without tickets every night on the piazza of the festival center Gasteig. Every year a different theme. Former topics include: Cats, Masters of Disaster, Pirates, Rock ‘N’ Roll, Surfing, Dance, Las Vegas, Jazz, Skate films. Screenings are open to the public and free of charge.

== Awards ==
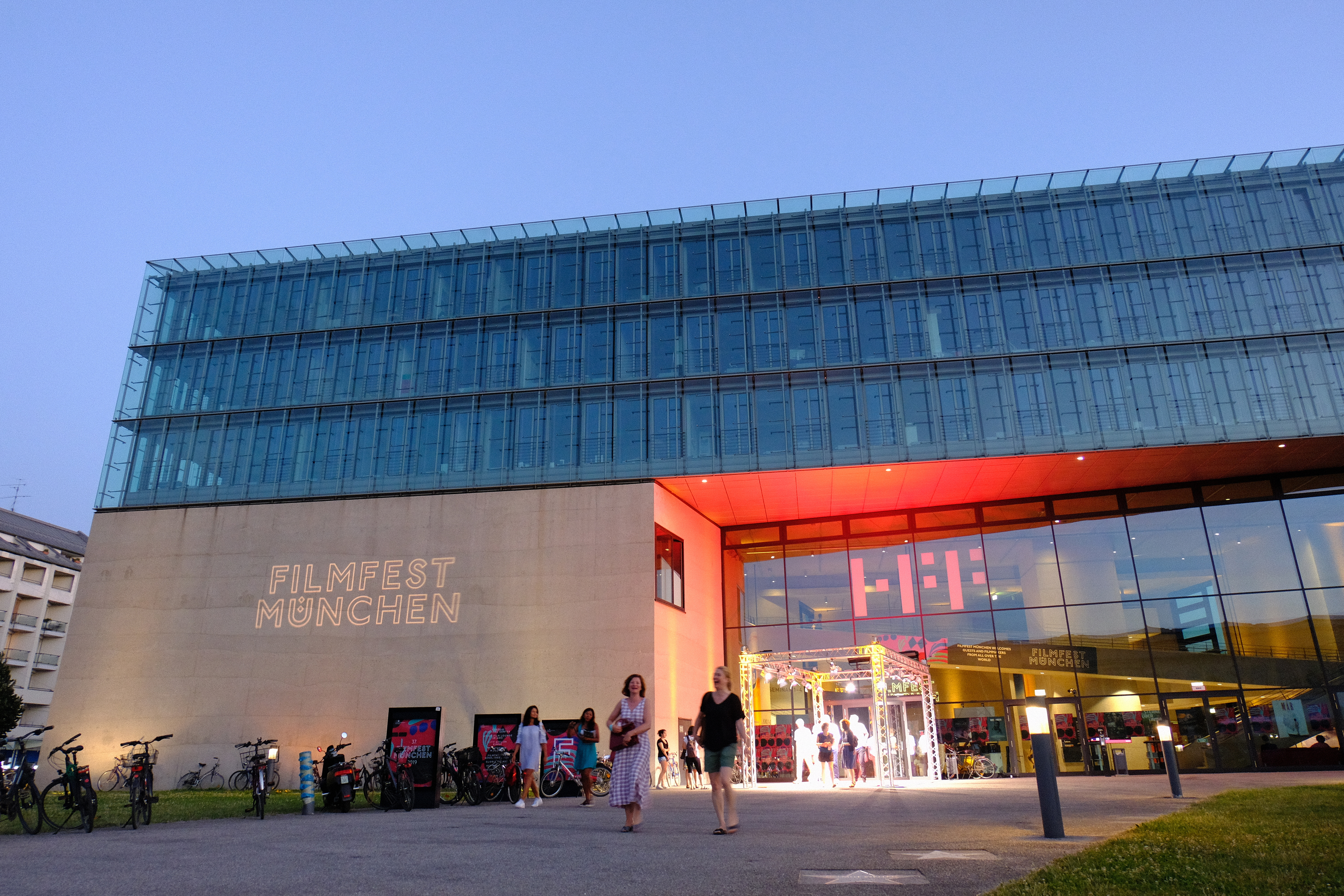
Munich's University of Television and Film during the Filmfest (2019)

The Filmfest München awards the following prizes (worth roughly €250,000):

- The ARRI/OSRAM Award (services from ARRI and OSRAM worth €50,000) goes to the Best Film (non-German language). It has been awarded by ARRI since 2008 and by OSRAM since 2013.
- The CineMerit Award (established in 1997) honors outstanding personalities in the international film community for extraordinary contributions to motion pictures as an art form.
- The CineVision Award and €12 000 go to the Best Film by an Emerging Director. It is intended to support upcoming directors and provide them with exposure in Germany. The winner is selected from the CineVision section of the program and is endowed by Wild Bunch.
- The CineVision Award goes to the best international co-production involving German co-producers.
- The German Cinema New Talent Awards are donated by the DZ Bank, Bavaria Film and Bavarian Broadcasting. The prizes go to the best director, best producer, best screenwriter, and best actor and actress in narrative films in the festival's New German Cinema section.
- The Bernd Burgemeister TV Movie Award (previously the VFF TV Movie Award) is awarded by the VFF, the German Film & TV Producers' royalty co. VFF to the producer of the Best German TV Movie in the festival program. €25,000 purse.
- The Bayern 2 and SZ Audience Award has been presented by the Süddeutsche Zeitung and radio station Bayern 2 since 2004. Filmfest audiences pick the winner.
- The Kinderfilmfest Audience Award: The children in the audiences vote for their favorite film.
- The One Future Prize (presented since 1986 and endowed by the Interfilm Akademie, München) goes to the film that shows, ethically as well as aesthetically, that our world has one common future.
- The Fritz Gerlich Preis is donated by the Munich-based production company Tellux and goes to a feature film or documentary that courageously deals with a topic of public concern, reflecting Fritz Gerlich's commitment to human rights. Gerlich was a journalist who openly opposed Adolf Hitler and was executed in 1934. €10,000 prize money.
- The Fipresci Preis goes to the best film in the section New German Cinema.

Prizes awarded to films other than those in the Filmfest München program:

- The Bernhard Wicki Film Prize – The Bridge has been awarded by the Bernhard Wicki Memorial Fund since 2002 and goes to film artists whose work builds bridges and inspires tolerance and humanitarianism. €10,000 prize money.
- The Children's Media Prize White Elephant is awarded by the Munich Media Club to outstanding children's films which foster positive development. Since 2002 at Filmfest München.
- The 13th Street Shocking Short is a short film award presented annually by NBC Universal pay-tv channel 13th Street. The winner receives a backstage pass to Universal Studios in Hollywood.
- The Treatment Competition for Documentaries is held by Bavarian Broadcasting and Global Screen GmbH München and serves to foster young documentary filmmakers and support documentary filmmaking in Germany and German-speaking countries in Europe. Three projects are awarded prizes worth €5,000, €3,000 and €2,000 (until 2014).
- The Look & Listen – Telepool-BR-Music-Award is endowed by Telepool, a subsidiary of Bayerischer Rundfunk. The award honors the music of an internationally acclaimed film music composer and is accompanied by a cash prize of €10,000 (until 2014).
- The Choreographic Captures-Award went to the best 60 second choreographic clip.
- The FFF Talent Award for Film Journalism is presented to a student from the German School of Journalism in Munich.
- The FIPRESCI Award by the international film critics’ association was presented for the first time in 2015 and honors the best film in the New German Cinema section.
