= Festival of Future Storytellers =

The FOFS - Festival of Future Storytellers, formerly known as Internationales Festival der Filmhochschulen München, also known as Filmschoolfest Munich, is an international festival for young filmmakers. More than 3,500 films were screened at the festival so far. The latest festival was held in November 2025.

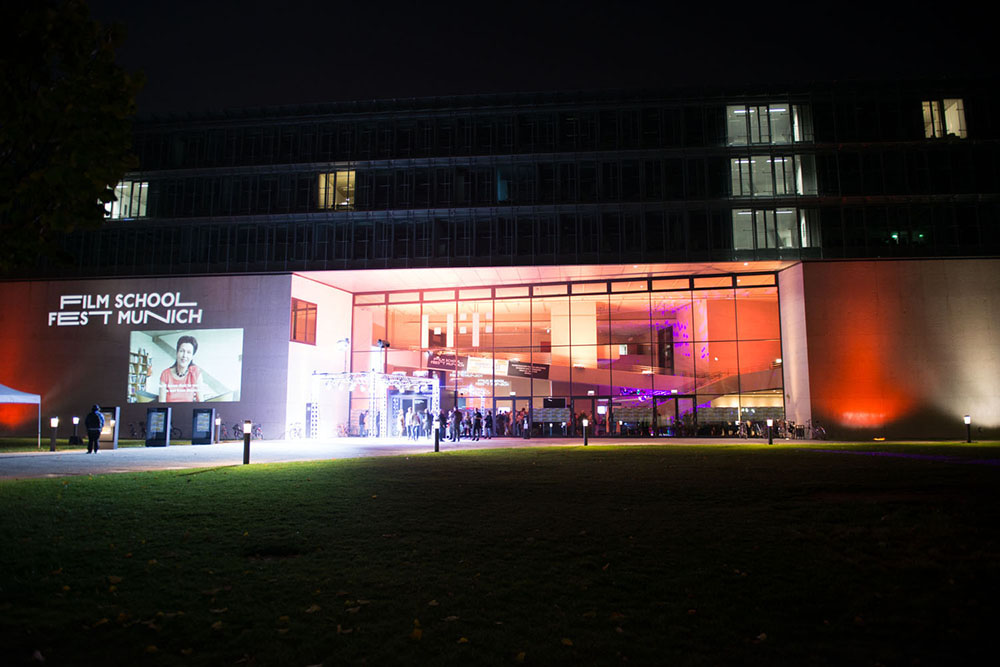
Filmschoolfest Munich Opening at HFF Munich

The festival was established by Professor Wolfgang Längsfeld in 1981. It is held annually by the "Internationale Münchner Filmwochen GmbH", which is also responsible for Filmfest München each summer. Festival director is Christoph Gröner, Artistic Director Julia Weigl (since 2023).

Film schools from all over the world can submit student short films, where the submissions are evaluated by a jury then chosen to be shown during the festival. Each year, approximately 100 foreign students and professors have the opportunity to meet and enter into discussions, win awards, and share their experiences with each other. An independent jury under the lead of a jury president choose the winning films. Among the jury presidents have been filmmakers such as Götz Otto, Philip Gröning, Marco Kreuzpaintner, Sebastian Schipper, Hans Steinbichler, Michael Ballhaus, Roland Emmerich, Wim Wenders und Bernd Eichinger. Several well-known filmmakers were once participants of Filmschoolfest Munich - such as Lars von Trier, Thomas Vinterberg, Oscar-Winner Nick Park, Caroline Link, Jan Sverak, Florian Gallenberger, Sönke Wortmann, Marcus H. Rosenmüller, Rainer Kaufmann, Maren Ade and Detlev Buck.
