= Audience award =

An audience award is typically an award at a film festival (or some other type of cultural festival or similar competition) which is selected by the audience attending the festival rather than by the festival jury or a group of critics.

== Examples ==
A well-known example of audience awards are those given out at the Sundance Film Festival, which is one of the leading independent film festivals in the world. Sundance first awarded audience awards in 1989 and now has separate audience awards for dramatic, documentary, and world cinema. These awards have become among the most important awards granted at the festival. The first Sundance Audience Award winner was Steven Soderbergh's Sex, Lies, and Videotape, whose success at Sundance produced a studio bidding war and which then became the first hit film to come out of the Sundance festival. The Audience Award came to be seen as a better indicator of potential commercial success than the juried awards.

A different example is the Independent Lens Audience Award, in which the television viewing audience is invited to rate each episode of the PBS independent film series (through online voting), and an award is given to each season's best-rated episode.

== Judging ==
Some popular awards shows, such as the Nickelodeon Kids' Choice Awards and People's Choice Awards use polling or online voting by a viewing audience to make selections, although these awards are typically not limited to an audience that has attended a specific festival or viewed a specific set of film or television programs.

== See also ==
- List of film awards
- List of Sundance Film Festival award winners
- Angoulême International Comics Festival Prize Awarded by the Audience
