= List of film festivals in Europe =

This is a list of Wikipedia articles about film festivals in Europe.

== Albania ==
Name	Est.	Location	Type	Details
Tirana International Film Festival	2003	Tirana	International	September
International Film Summerfest of Durrës	2008	Durrës	International	Annual

== Armenia ==
Name	Est.	Location	Type	Details
Golden Apricot Yerevan International Film Festival	2004	Yerevan	International	Mid-July

== Austria ==
Name	Est.	Location	Type	Details
Crossing Europe	2004	Linz	European films	Last week of April
Diagonale	1998	Graz	Austrian films	Annually in March.
VIFF Vienna Independent Film Festival	2015	Vienna	International	Annually in July.
Innsbruck Nature Film Festival	2001	Innsbruck	Competition on the topics of nature and environment	Annually in October
Viennale	1960	Vienna	International	Annually in October.
Vienna Shorts	2004	Vienna	Special interest	Annually in May.

== Azerbaijan ==
Name	Est.	Location	Type
Baku International Film Festival East-West	1991	Baku	International
Baku International Tourism Film Festival	2013	Baku	International

== Belarus ==
Name	Est.	Location	Type	Details
Minsk International Film Festival Listapad	1994	Minsk	Competitive specialized film festival of Baltic countries, as well as countries of Central Asia, Central and Eastern Europe	Beginning of November

== Belgium ==
Name	Est.	Location	Type	Details
Brussels Film Festival	1974	Brussels	International-regional	Formerly Brussels International Film Festival. Last edition: 2016.
Brussels Independent Film Festival	1974	Brussels	Special interest	
Brussels International Fantastic Film Festival	1983	Brussels	Horror, thriller and science fiction	April
Brussels International Film Festival	2018	Brussels	International	
Brussels Short Film Festival	1998	Brussels	Short films	
DOCVILLE - International Documentary Film Festival	2005	Leuven	International-national, competitive	
European Youth Film Festival	1989	Antwerp, Bruges	International children/youth	February–March
Festival International du Film Francophone de Namur	1984	Namur	French speaking films	September–October
Film Fest Ghent	1974	Ghent	International	October
Mons International Film Festival	1984	Mons	Romantic films	
Offscreen Film Festival	2008	Brussels	Independent films	
Ostend Film Festival	2007	Ostend	International-National	Mid-September
MOOOV Film Festival	2013	Turnhout, Bruges, Genk, Sint-Niklaas, Lier, Roeselare, Koersel-Beringen	International	

== Bosnia and Herzegovina ==
Name	Est.	Location	Type	Details
Al Jazeera Balkans Documentary Film Festival	2018	Sarajevo	International documentary	
Merlinka Festival	2009	Sarajevo, Belgrade or Podgorica	International	
Tuzla Film Festival	2012	Tuzla	International (ex-Yugoslavia)	Annually in September/October
Kratkofil	2007	Banja Luka		
Sarajevo Film Festival	1995	Sarajevo	International	Annually in mid-August.
Sarajevo Fashion Film Festival	2015	Sarajevo	International	
Pravo Ljudski Film Festival	2006	Sarajevo	International, human rights documentaries	Annually in September.
Sarajevo Youth Film Festival	2008	Sarajevo	International	
VIVA Film Festival	2015	Sarajevo, Kakanj, Vareš	International religious, ecological and touristic documentaries	Annually in June, application during January and March

== Bulgaria ==
Name	Est.	Location	Type	Details
Golden Rose National Film Festival	1961	Varna	National	
Sofia International Film Festival	1997	Sofia	International	Also known as Sofia Film Fest. Held annually in March. Competitive specialized festival for first and second feature films.

== Croatia ==
Name	Est.	Location	Type	Details
Animafest Zagreb	1972	Zagreb, Croatia	International	The second oldest and one of the most important animation film festival in the world. Held annually in June.
Split Film Festival	1996	Split	International	Held annually in late September.
Croatian Minute Movie Cup	1993	Požega		
Kastav Film Festival	2009	Kastav	International	
Motovun Film Festival	1999	Motovun	International	Held annually in late July.
Pula Film Festival	1953	Pula	Croatian, international	Held annually in mid-July
Subversive Film Festival	2008	Zagreb		
Vukovar Film Festival	2007	Vukovar	International	Held in late August
ZagrebDox	2005	Zagreb	Special interest	February–March
Zagreb Film Festival	2003	Zagreb	International	Held annually in October
Zagreb Jewish Film Festival	2007	Zagreb		

== Czech Republic ==
Name	Est.	Location	Type	Details
Academia Film Olomouc	1966	Olomouc	Special interest	
Animefest	2004	Brno	Special interest	Japanese animation and culture program, AMV and cosplay competitions, held annually in May.
Bollywood Film Festival	2004	Prague	Special interest	Presents Bollywood films to Czech audiences.
Cinema Mundi International Film Festival	2010	Brno	International	
Febiofest	1993	Nationwide	International	
Finále Plzeň Film Festival	1968	Plzeň		April
Fresh Film Festival	2004	Karlovy Vary	Special interest	
International Festival of Animated Films AniFest	2002	Třeboň		
Ji.hlava International Documentary Film Festival	1997	Jihlava	International	Held annually in October.
Karlovy Vary International Film Festival	1948	Karlovy Vary	International	Held annually in July.
Mezipatra	2000	Brno/Prague	Special interest / LBGT	Held annually in November.
One World Film Festival	1999	Prague	Screens documentaries on human rights	
Prague Independent Film Festival	2016	Prague	International	Held annually in August
Zlín Film Festival	1961	Zlín	International	Has competition, held annually in late May.

== Cyprus ==
Name	Est.	Location	Type
Cyprus International Film Festival	2006	Nicosia	International
Cyprus International Short Film Festival	2008	Nicosia	International

== Denmark ==
Name	Est.	Location	Type	Details
Copenhagen International Documentary Film Festival	2003	Copenhagen	Special interest	
Copenhagen International Film Festival	2003	Copenhagen	International	Discontinued
Odense International Film Festival	1975	Odense	International	Short film festival held annually in August
NatFilm Festival	1990	Aalborg, Copenhagen, Odense		

== Estonia ==
Name	Est.	Location	Type	Details
Tallinn Black Nights Film Festival	2002	Tallinn, Tartu	International	Held annually in November and December; has touring screenings in cities throughout Estonia.
International Random Film Festival	2009	Anija	International	Held annually in a randomly selected location. Selection process is random.

== Finland ==
Name	Est.	Location	Type	Details
Animatricks Animation Festival	2000	Helsinki	Special interest	Annual. Programme consists of feature animations, short animation screenings and competition screenings.
Cinemaissí	2005	Helsinki	International	
Espoo Ciné International Film Festival	1990	Espoo	International	
Helsinki International Film Festival	1988	Helsinki	International	
Midnight Sun Film Festival	1986	Sodankylä	International	
Night Visions	1998	Helsinki	Special interest	
Oulu International Children's and Youth Film Festival	1982	Oulu	International	
Tampere Film Festival	1969	Tampere	Special interest	
Vinokino	1991	Turku, Helsinki	Special interest	

== France ==
Name	Est.	Location	Type	Details
ACID (Cannes)	1992	Cannes	International	Parallel section of Cannes Film Festival
Angers European First Film Festival	1989	Angers	European films	
Annecy International Animation Film Festival	1960	Annecy	Special interest	
Brest European Short Film Festival	1986	Brest	Special interest	Short films from Western and Eastern Europe, the Mediterranean and Scandinavia in the European Competition
Cannes Film Festival	1939	Cannes	International	One of the world's oldest, most influential and prestigious festivals, it is held annually (usually in May) at the Palais des Festivals et des Congrès
Chéries-Chéris	1994	Paris	International	Annual, devoted to LGBT films
Créteil International Women's Film Festival	1978	Créteil	Special interest	Showcase of films by female directors
Deauville American Film Festival	1975	Deauville	Special interest	Annual, devoted to American cinema.
Deauville Asian Film Festival	1999	Deauville	Special interest	Annual, devoted to Asian cinema
ÉCU The European Independent Film Festival	2006	Paris	International	Annual, devoted to independent films
Extravagant India	2013	Paris	Indian films	Annual
Festival du Film Merveilleux	2010	Paris	International	Annual film festival celebrating the imaginary, the wonder and magic from all over the world
Festival des Cinémas d'Afrique du pays d'Apt	2003	Apt	International	Annual film festival of African cinema
Festival international du film fantastique de Gérardmer	1994	Gérardmer	Special interest	Annual, devoted to horror and fantastic cinema (Festival du Film Fantastique) cinema
Festival International du Film Panafricain	2006	Cannes	African cinema	Aka International Pan-African Film Festival; Dikalo Awards by Eitel Basile Ngangue Ebelle; still in existence as of 2022.
Lumière Film Festival	2009	Lyon	Historical film	
Paris International Fantastic Film Festival	2011	Paris	Special interest	Annual, devoted to horror and science-fiction films
Paris Lesbian and Feminist Film Festival	1989	Paris	International	Women-only festival featuring films by and about lesbians and feminism
Paris Independent Film Festival	2015	Paris	International	Annual festival.
Toulouse Spanish Film Festival (Cinespaña)	1996	Toulouse	Spanish films	
Three Continents Festival	1979	Nantes	Special interest	Annual, is devoted to the cinemas of Asia, Africa and Latin America.
War on Screen	2013	Châlons-en-Champagne	Special interest	Annual international film festival devoted to conflicts.

== Germany ==
Name	Est.	Location	Type	Details
Berlin International Directors Lounge	2005	Berlin	International	
Berlin International Film Festival	1951	Berlin	International	
Dok Leipzig	1955	Leipzig	Special interest	
European Media Art Festival	1981	Osnabrück	Special interest	Annual experimental film and media art festival.
Feminale		Cologne	Special interest	Annual feminist film festival.
Filmfest Dresden	1989	Dresden	International	International short film festival.
Filmfest Hamburg	1992	Hamburg	International and German cinema	Held annually in September/October, focused on feature films.
Filmfest München	1983	Munich	International	
filmkunstfest Mecklenburg-Vorpommern	1992	Schwerin	German and international film	
Hof International Film Festival	1967	Hof	International	
International Cycling Film Festival	2005	Herne	Special interest	
Munich International Documentary Film Festival (DOK.fest München)	1985	Munich	International	Held annually in May
Internationales Festival der Filmhochschulen München	1981	Munich	International	
International Film Awards Berlin (ifab)	2012	Berlin	International	
International Filmfestival Mannheim-Heidelberg	1952	Mannheim, Heidelberg	International	
International Short Film Festival Oberhausen	1954	Oberhausen	Special interest	
NaturVision Fimfestival	2002	Ludwigsburg	International Competition for Filmmakers on the Subject of Nature, Animal and Environment	
Nippon Connection	2000	Frankfurt	Special interest	world's biggest festival showing exclusively Japanese film
Nordische Filmtage	1956	Lübeck	Special interest	Held annually in November, spotlighting the cinemas of Scandinavia and the Baltic states.
Oldenburg International Film Festival	1994	Oldenburg	International	
SCHLINGEL International Film Festival	1996	Chemnitz	International	
B3 Biennial of the Moving Image	2013	Frankfurt	International	Held every two years, since 2019 annually in October, focused on new narration techniques
goEast Film Festival	2001	Wiesbaden	Eastern and Central Europe	

== Greece ==
Name	Est.	Location	Type	Details
Drama International Short Film Festival	1978	Drama	International	
International Thessaloniki Film Festival	1959	Thessaloniki	International	Held annually in November.
Mykonos Biennale	2013	Mykonos	International	Held bi-annually in June.
Thessaloniki Documentary Festival	1999	Thessaloniki	Special interest	
Thessaloniki Video Dance Festival	2000	Thessaloniki	Special interest	Dance festival with a showcase of dance films.

== Hungary ==
Name	Est.	Location	Type	Details
CineFest Miskolc International Film Festival	2004	Miskolc	International	annual; September festival
Kecskemet Animation Film Festival	1985	Kecskemét	Special interest	biennial; June festival; associated with the Festival of European Animated Feature Films and TV Specials
Media Wave International Film Festival	1991	Győr	Special interest	annual; April–May festival; associated with the Visual Arts

== Iceland ==
Name	Est.	Location	Type	Details
Reykjavík International Film Festival	2004	Reykjavík	International	
Stockfish Film Festival	2015	Reykjavík	International	International feature films, with a short film competition reserved for Icelandic films.

== Ireland ==
Name	Est.	Location	Type	Details
Cork Film Festival	1956	Cork	International	
Darklight Film Festival	1999	Dublin	Special interest	
Fingal Film Festival	2012	Dublin	International	
Fresh Film Festival	1996	Limerick	Special Interest	
Galway Film Fleadh	1989	Galway	International	
GAZE International LGBT Film Festival Dublin or "GAZE"	1992	Dublin	International / LGBT	
Jameson Dublin International Film Festival	2002	Dublin	International	
Waterford Film Festival	2007	Waterford		
Galway African Film Festival	2008	Galway	African Film	

== Italy ==
Name	Est.	Location	Type	Details
Al Ard Film Festival	2002	Cagliari	Special interest International	Annual film festival for films about Palestine and the Arab world mainly focused on documentaries
CinemadaMare Film Festival	2003			Annual, for amateur youth filmmakers
Courmayeur Noir Film Festival	1991	Courmayeur	Film noir	
Fantafestival	1981	Rome	Special interest	Annual, of science fiction, horror and thriller films.
Far East Film Festival	1999	Udine	Special interest	One of the biggest events promoting Asian Cinema in Europe.
Festival del Cinema all'Aperto "Accordi @ DISACCORDI"	2000	Naples	Special interest International	Annual three months outdoor Film Festival
Flaiano Film Festival	1974	Pescara	International	Annual International festival with prizes for the films, the foreign film, interpreters male and female roles, male and female interpreters, not actors, directors, photographers, editing, soundtrack, set design, costumes. Also, we assigned the special jury prize, best film debut and also the career award.
Giffoni Film Festival	1971	Giffoni Valle Piana	International	One of the largest film festivals for kids, held annually in July, with short films and features from around the world.
Il Cinema Ritrovato	1986	Bologna	Rare and restored films	Held annually in June.
Io Isabella International Film Week	2005		Special interest	Spotlights the work by and about women, particularly documentaries.
Ischia Film Festival	2005	Ischia	International	Focuses on film locations
Ischia Global Film & Music Festival	2003	Ischia	International	
Lucca Film Festival	2005	Lucca	International	
La Guarimba International Film Festival	2013	Amantea	International	La Guarimba is a cultural association and an international film festival that takes place annually in August and screens short films from all over the world.
Milan International Film Festival	2000	Milan	International	
Pordenone Silent Film Festival	1982	Pordenone	Silent film	Held annually in October.
Religion Today	1997	Trento	International	The first film festival about religion and dialogue, held annually in October.
Rome Independent Cinema Festival	2018	Rome	International	Held annually in August.
Rome Independent Film Festival	2001	Rome	International	Held annually in November.
Sport Movies & TV - Milano International FICTS Fest	1983	Milan	International	The world's final of the "World FICTS Challenge", the Worldwide Championship of Cinema, Television and Sport Culture, organized by the FICTS.
CINEMA. Festa Internazionale di Roma	2006	Rome	International	Held annually in October.
Taormina Film Festival	1955	Taormina	International	Held annually in summer.
Trieste Film Festival	1989	Trieste	International	The leading Italian event on central and eastern European cinema, held annually on the thirst week of January.
Trieste Science+Fiction Festival	2000	Trieste	International, Special interest	Held annually in November, it is a multidisciplinary event devoted to the exploration of the realms of the “fantastic” genre
Torino Film Festival	1982	Turin	International	Held annually in November
Venice Film Festival	1932	Venice	International	The world's oldest film festival, it is held annually in late August or early September on the island of the Lido.

== Kosovo ==
Name	Est.	Location	Type	Details
Dokufest – International Documentary and Short Film Festival	2002	Prizren	International	Held annual in the summer, e.g. August. The festival spans nine days.

== Latvia ==
Name	Est.	Location	Type	Details
Riga International Short Film Festival 2ANNAS	1996	Riga	International	An annual film festival for short films.

== Lithuania ==
Name	Est.	Location	Type	Details
VIFF Kino Pavasaris	1995	Vilnius	International	
Kaunas International Film Festival	2007	Kaunas	International	

== Monaco ==
Name	Est.	Location	Type	Details
Monaco International Film Festival	2003	Monte Carlo	Special interest	
Monaco Music Film Festival	2006	Monte Carlo	Special interest	

== Montenegro ==
Name	Est.	Location	Type	Details
Merlinka Festival	2009	Sarajevo, Belgrade or Podgorica	International	

== Netherlands ==
Name	Est.	Location	Type	Details
Amsterdam Fantastic Film Festival	1991	Amsterdam	Special interest	
Arab Film Festival	1996	Rotterdam	Special interest	
CinemAsia Film Festival	2004	Amsterdam	Special interest	
Dejima Japanese Film Festival	2005	Amsterdam, Rotterdam, Utrecht	Special interest	
Film by the Sea	1999	Vlissingen	International	Held annually in September
ShortCutz Amsterdam	2013	Amsterdam	Special interest	
International Film Festival Rotterdam	1972	Rotterdam	International	
International Documentary Film Festival Amsterdam	1988	Amsterdam	Special interest	
KLIK! Amsterdam Animation Festival	2007	Amsterdam	International	
Latin American Film Festival	2005	Utrecht	Special interest	
Leiden International Film Festival	2006	Leiden	International	
Leiden International Short Film Festival	2009	Leiden	Special interest	
Netherlands Film Festival	1982	Utrecht	Regional	
Pluk de nacht	2003	Amsterdam	International	
SCENECS International Debut Film Festival	2006	Amersfoort	International	

== North Macedonia ==
Name	Est.	Location	Type	Details
Manaki Brothers Film Festival	1979	Bitola	International	annual; September; Official competition for Cinematographers

== Norway ==
Name	Est.	Location	Type	Details
Arctic Film Festival	2019	Svalbard	International	
Bergen International Film Festival	2000	Bergen	International	
Norwegian International Film Festival	1973	Haugesund	International	
Norway Tamil Film Festival Awards	2010	Oslo	International	
Kosmorama Trondheim International Film Festival	2004	Trondheim	International	
Tromsø International Film Festival	1991	Tromsø	International	

== Poland ==
Name	Est.	Location	Type	Details
Ale Kino! International Young Audience Film Festival	1969	Poznań	International, children's film	Films addressed to children and young adults
Animator	2008	Poznań	International, animation	The most important animated film festival in Poland
American Film Festival	2010	Wrocław	American film	Showcases films from the United States
Camerimage	1993	Toruń	International, cinematography	Dedicated to the art of cinematography; the host city changed as follows: 1993–1999 Toruń, 2000–2009 Łódź, 2010–2018 Bydgoszcz, 2019–present Toruń
Etiuda&Anima International Film Festival	1994	Kraków	International, short film	
Five Flavours Film Festival	2007	Warsaw	Asian film	Dedicated to the cinema of Southeast and East Asia
Gdynia Film Festival	1974	Gdynia	National	The main event celebrating Polish live-action films
International Cycling Film Festival	2012	Katowice	Special interest	Bicycle-related films; in Poland, Germany and the Netherlands
Jewish Motifs International Film Festival	2003	Warsaw	International	Jewish-themed films
Kraków Film Festival	1960	Kraków	International, short film	Short film festival of global importance; the oldest film event in Poland
New Horizons Film Festival	2001	Wrocław	International, avant-garde	One of the biggest and most influential cultural events in Poland
Off Camera	2008	Kraków	International, independent film	
Science and Technology Film Festival	2025	Kraków	International, experimental, independent film, short film	Sci-fi and technology-themed films
Short Waves Festival	2009	Poznań	International, short film	Short film festival; started as a multi-location event held in numerous cities around the globe; since 2016 it is held only in its original headquarters of Poznań
Tofifest	2002	Toruń	International, independent film	
Transatlantyk Festival	2011	Łódź	International	Moved from Poznań to Łódź in 2016
Warsaw International Film Festival	1984	Warsaw	International	Held annually in October

== Portugal ==
Name	Est.	Location	Type	Details
Caminhos do Cinema Português	1988	Coimbra	Special Interest	An international festival for Portuguese films.
Doclisboa	2004	Lisbon	Special interest	An international film festival for documentaries.
Douro Film Harvest	2009	Douro	International	Held annually in September
Estoril Film Festival	2006	Estoril	International	Held annually in November, the competition section is open to international films, animation, fiction and documentaries
Fantasporto	1982	Porto	International	Fantasy, horror, action and science-fiction festival.
Festróia - Tróia International Film Festival	1985	Setúbal	Special interest	Held annually during the first week in June, the competitive section is open to films from countries producing less than 30 features per year.
Lisbon Gay & Lesbian Film Festival	1996	Lisbon	Special interest	Dedicated exclusively to screening gay, lesbian, bisexual, transgender, and transsexual themed films.
Olhares do Mediterrâneo - Cinema no Feminino	2014	Lisbon	Special interest	An international film festival for films made by women of Mediterranean countries.

== Romania ==
Name	Est.	Location	Type	Details
Comedy Cluj	2009	Cluj-Napoca	International	International film festival of comedy film organized annually in October.
F-Sides	2020	Bucharest		Romanian cineclub and feminist film festival.
Gay Film Nights	2004	Cluj-Napoca	Special interest	LGBT themed film festival.
Transilvania International Film Festival	2002	Cluj-Napoca	International	International film festival, most important film-related event in Romania.

== Russia ==
Name	Est.	Location	Type	Details
Festival of Festivals, Saint Petersburg	1993	Saint Petersburg	International	
Kinoshock	1995	Anapa	International	Open Film Festival of CIS and Baltic countries
Kinotavr Film Festival	1991	Sochi	International	
KROK International Animated Films Festival	1989	Cities along the Volga or Dnieper rivers	Special Interest	International animation festival which is held in Russia on even years and in Ukraine on odd years. It takes place on a cruise ship and visits various cities.
Message to Man	1988	Saint Petersburg	International	
Moscow International Film Festival	1935	Moscow	International	
Open Russian Festival of Animated Film	1996	Suzdal	Special Interest	
Side by Side Lesbian and Gay International Film Festival	2008	Saint Petersburg	International	
Sozvezdie	1989	Various	International	
Stalker International Film Festival on Human Rights	1995	Moscow and regional cities	International	Focusing on human rights, the festival opens on International Human Rights Day, 10 December, each year

== Serbia ==
Name	Est.	Location	Type	Details
Niš Film Festival	1966	Niš	International	
FEST	1971	Belgrade	International	Conceptualized as "the festival of festivals". Screening a selection of award-winning films from recent top international festivals as well as currently trending films. Belgrade's best-known film festival.
Palić Film Festival	1992	Palić	International	"Golden Tower" award. Held annually in July.
Cinema City	2007	Novi Sad	International	"Ibis" award
Küstendorf	2008	Drvengrad	International	Held annually in January. Short films enter competition for the festival main award – the Golden Egg. The festival is organized and run by Emir Kusturica.
FreeNetWorld International Film Fest	2008	Niš	International	The best FNW film award. The best documentary film. The best animated film. The best fiction. The best music video/experimental film. Audience award.
Free Zone Film Festival	2005	Belgrade	International	
Merlinka Festival	2009	Sarajevo, Belgrade or Podgorica	International	

== Slovakia ==
Name	Est.	Location	Type	Details
Art Film Fest	1992	Trenčianske Teplice, Trenčín	International	
Golden Beggar	1995	Košice	International	
International Film Festival Bratislava	1999	Bratislava	International	
International Film Festival Cinematik	2006	Piešťany	International	

== Slovenia ==
Name	Est.	Location	Type	Details
Filofest	2006	Ljubljana	Special interest	
Ljubljana International Film Festival	1989	Ljubljana	International	
Grossmann Film and Wine Festival	2005	Ljutomer	Regional	

== Spain ==
Name	Est.	Location	Type	Details
Animac – Catalunya International Animation Film Festival	1996	Lleida	Special interest	
Barcelona International Women's Film Festival, aka Mostra Films Dones Barcelona	1993	Barcelona	Special interest	
BCN Film Fest	2017	Barcelona	International	
Gijón International Film Festival	1963	Gijón	International	FIAPF-accredited competitive specialised feature film festival ('films for young people')
Huelva Ibero-American Film Festival	1975	Huelva	Ibero-American	
Málaga Film Festival	1998	Málaga	Spanish and Latin American	FIAPF-accredited competitive specialised feature film festival ('Spanish-speaking films')
Marbella Film Festival	2006	Marbella	International	
Mostra de València-Cinema del Mediterrani	1980	Valencia	Mediterranean	FIAPF-accredited competitive specialised feature film festival ('Mediterranean films')
Las Palmas de Gran Canaria International Film Festival	2000	Las Palmas de Gran Canaria	International	
San Sebastián International Film Festival	1953	San Sebastián	International	FIAPF-accredited competitive feature film festival
Seville European Film Festival	2004	Seville	European	Held annually in November
Sitges Film Festival	1967	Sitges	Special interest	FIAPF-accredited competitive specialised feature film festival ('Fantasy Film')
Valladolid International Film Festival (Seminci)	1956	Valladolid	International	

== Sweden ==
Name	Est.	Location	Type	Details
BUFF International Film Festival	1984	Malmö	Special interest	
Filmörnen	1978	Värmland	Special interest	
Gothenburg Film Festival	1979	Gothenburg	International	
HBT-GBG	2007	Gothenburg	Special interest	
Lund International Fantastic Film Festival	1995	Lund	Special interest	
Malmö Arab Film Festival	2011	Malmö	Special interest	
Nordisk Panorama Film Festival	1990	Malmö	Special interest	Festival for Nordic documentaries and short films. Held annually in September.
Raketfilm	2011	Karlstad	Special interest	Short films
Stockholm International Film Festival	1990	Stockholm	International	
Uppsala International Short Film Festival	1982	Uppsala	Special interest	
International Random Film Festival	2009	Garpenberg	International	

== Switzerland ==
Name	Est.	Location	Type	Attendance	Details
Fantoche	1995	Baden	Special interest	21,500 (2022)	Held annually in September. Specialises in animation.
Fribourg International Film Festival	1980	Fribourg	International	43,000 (2022)	Held annually in March.
Geneva International Film Festival	1995	Geneva	International	40,000 (2021)	Held annually in November. Festival devoted to cinema, television, and digital creation. Includes a Digital Market programme dedicated to new digital trends.
Lausanne Underground Film and Music Festival	2000	Lausanne	Special interest	11,000 (2022)	Held annually in October. Film and music festival devoted to underground culture.
Locarno International Film Festival	1946	Locarno	International	128,500 (2022)	Held annually in August.
Mobile Motion Film Festival	2014	Zürich	Special interest	1,000 (2021)	Held annually in November. Specialises in films shot with a mobile phone.
Neuchâtel International Fantastic Film Festival	2000	Neuchâtel	Special interest	50,000 (2022)	Held annually in July. Genre festival for fantasy, horror, sci-fi and cult films.
Queersicht	1997	Bern	Special interest	2'745 (2021)	Held annually in November. Oldest LGBT film festival in Switzerland.
shnit international shortfilmfestival	2003	Bern	Short film	20,000 (2019)	Held annually in October. Has not been held since 2019, future in doubt.
Solothurn Film Festival	1966	Solothurn	Swiss film	55,000 (2023)	Held annually in January. Most important festival for Swiss cinema
Visions du Réel	1969	Nyon	International	46,000 (2022)	Held annually in April. Most important documentary film festival in Switzerland.
Zurich Film Festival	2005	Zürich	International	137,000 (2022)	Held annually in September. Switzerland's most attended film festival since 2020.

== Turkey ==
Name	Est.	Location	Type	Details
Ankara Flying Broom Women's Film Festival	1997	Ankara	Special interest	
International Antalya Golden Orange Film Festival	1963	Antalya	International	
Istanbul International Film Festival	1982	Istanbul	International	
Istanbul Animation Festival	2003	Istanbul	International	
Adana Golden Boll International Film Festival	1993	Adana	International	
International Labor Film Festival	2006	Istanbul, Ankara, İzmir	International	

== Ukraine ==
Name	Est.	Location	Type	Details
Molodist	1970	Kyiv	International	The oldest and the most well-known Ukrainian film festival
Kyiv International Short Film Festival	2012	Kyiv	International	Short films festival
Odesa International Film Festival	2010	Odesa	International	The widest and most popular festival in Ukraine
KROK International Animated Films Festival	1989	Cities along the Volga or Dnieper rivers	Special Interest	International animation festival which is held in Russia on even years and in Ukraine on odd years. It takes place on a cruise ship and visits various cities.
Mute Nights Festival	2010	Odesa	Special Interest	International silent film festival which is held in Odesa on the third week on June.
Stozhary	1995	Kyiv	Special interest	An actors' film festival, in which actors' performances on film are the focus of jury assessment and awards.
Wiz-Art	2008	Lviv	International	International short film festival
Children KinoFest	2014	Kyiv	International	International children's film festival

== United Kingdom ==
=== England ===
Name	Est.	Location	Type	Details
Aesthetica Short Film Festival	2011	York	Independent Film	
Bath Film Festival	2012	Bath	Previews	Features Docs and Shorts film festival. Categories for Art & Design, Sci-Fi, Bath Debuts
Birds Eye View	2005	London	Special interest	Disestablished in 2014. For emerging women directors.
British Urban Film Festival	2005	London	Independent film	Also called BUFF, the festival is held every year around September
Cambridge Film Festival	1977	Cambridge	Annual festival	Public festival. Third oldest in the UK after London and Edinburgh
Colchester Film Festival	2012	Colchester, Essex	Independent film	International, UK, and local films alongside filmmaking workshops and masterclasses
East End Film Festival	2000	London	Independent film	Disestablished in 2020. International, UK, and local East London films alongside music and industry events.
Encounters Short Film and Animation Festival	1995	Bristol	International	Annual international film festival. Qualifying competition for BAFTAs, Oscars and European Film Awards.
Flatpack Film Festival	2006	Birmingham	International	Held annually in March.
Flip Animation Festival	2004	Wolverhampton	International	Held annually in October.
FrightFest	2002	London	Special interest	Annual horror and fantasy festival.
From Page to Screen Festival	2011	Bridport	Special interest	Celebrates and rewards excellence in film adaptation of books, affiliated with the Bridport Prize fiction competition.
Kendal Mountain Film Festival	1980	Kendal	Mountain film	Third weekend in November
Leeds International Film Festival	1986	Leeds	International	Largest film festival in England outside London.
London Asian Film Festival	1999	London	International	Held annually in spring at the BFI or BAFTA.
London Image Festival		London	Special interest	Dedicated to photography and cinematography.
London Independent Film Festival	2007	London	International	Held annually to support independent films and screenplays
London Indian Film Festival	2010	London	South Asian Cinema	Focuses on Indian independent film.
London Film Festival	1956	London	International	Held annually by the British Film Institute.
London Fashion Film Festival	2014	London	International	Held annually by the London Fashion Film Festival.
London Lesbian & Gay Film Festival	1986	London	International	Held annually by the British Film Institute.
London Turkish Film Festival	1993	London	International	Selection of Turkish features, documentaries and short films, with many UK premieres and directorial debuts.
Manchester Film Festival	2015	Manchester	International	For British and International films.
Meniscus Film Festival	2001	Grimsby	International	Held annually by film fans, filmmakers and volunteers.
New Renaissance Film Festival	2015	London	International	For independent films, showcasing feature-length and short films.
Norwich Film Festival	2009	Norwich	International	BIFA (British Independent Film Awards) qualifying short film festival that champions independent film. Annual, held in November.
onedotzero		London	Special interest	Worldwide digital short film festival.
Pennine Film Festival	2006	Lancashire	Community	Exhibitor and all-round film education resource for the independent film.
Public Health Film Festival	2014	Oxford	Community	Free festival featuring screenings, talks and workshops around health related films.
Raindance Film Festival	1993	London	Special interest	A festival for independent films, the festival is also the founder of the British Independent Film Awards.
Romford Film Festival	2017	London	International	Held annually to support independent films
Sheffield DocFest	1994	Sheffield	International	The UK's biggest documentary festival and the third largest in the world. Held annually in June.
Slapstick Festival	2005	Bristol	Special interest	A film festival celebrating silent comedy films, as well as films that feature physical and visual comedy.
The End of the Pier International Film Festival	2002	West Sussex	Special interest	An independent film festival, it shows work by local filmmakers, as well as international shorts and features.
Walthamstow International Film Festival	2010	London	International	An annual independent film festival, with a focus on short films by local and international filmmakers.
Underwire Film Festival	2010	London	International	An annual independent film festival, dedicated to promoting and celebrating female talent within the film industry.
UK Film Festival	2011	London	International	Focused on the discovery of new filmmakers, but also welcomes established talent.
Wildscreen Festival	1982	Bristol	International, Special interest	A film festival consisting of the Panda Awards and an Official Selection. It recognises the best in the global wildlife and environmental film industry and celebrates creative storytelling.

=== Northern Ireland ===
Name	Est.	Location	Type	Details
Belfast Film Festival	1995	Belfast		
CineMagic	1988	Belfast	Special interest	
Foyle Film Festival	1987	Derry		

=== Scotland ===
Name	Est.	Location	Type	Details
Africa in Motion	2006	Edinburgh	African cinema	
Dead by Dawn	1993	Edinburgh	Special interest	
Deep Fried Film Festival	2004	Coatbridge	International	
Edinburgh International Film Festival	1947	Edinburgh	International	
Edinburgh Mountain Film Festival	2003	Edinburgh	International	
Glasgow Film Festival	2005	Glasgow		
International Film Festival of St Andrews	2022	St Andrews	International	Held annually in Spring at the University of St Andrews

=== Wales ===
Name	Est.	Location	Type	Details
Abertoir	2006	Aberystwyth	Horror films	Held annually in October
Cardiff Film Festival	1989–2006	Cardiff		October
Wales International Film Festival	2017	Swansea	International	October
Wales One World (WOW) Film Festival	c.2001	Aberystwyth	International	February–March
