= Anija Nature Reserve =

Protected area in Estonia

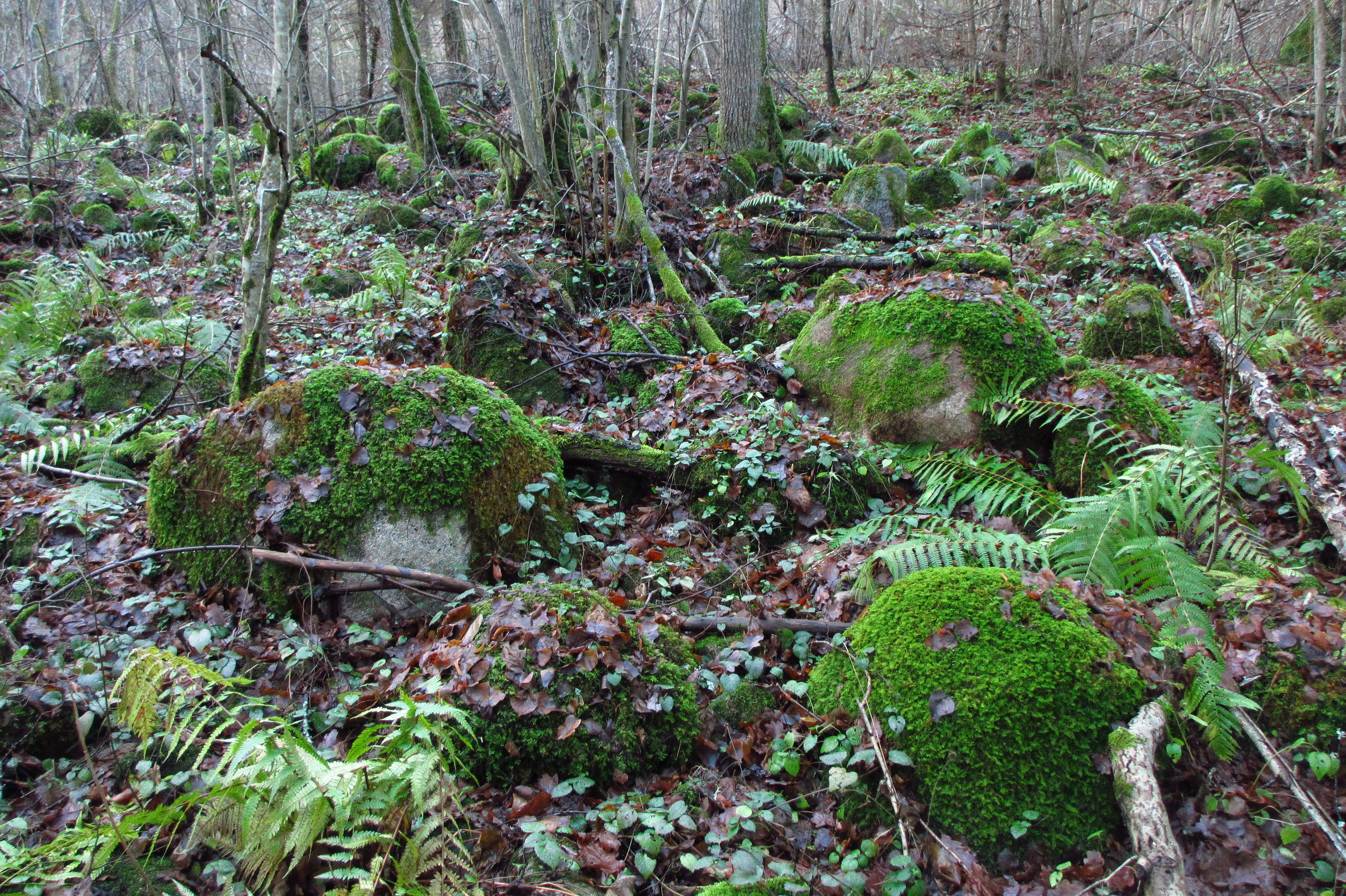

- Location within Estonia
- Location: Estonia
- Coordinates: 59°22′21″N 25°16′34″E
- Area: 72 ha
- Established: 1990 (1999)

Anija Nature Reserve is a nature reserve which is located in Harju County, Estonia.

The area of the nature reserve is 72 ha.

The protected area was founded in 1990 on the basis of Anija botanical-landscape conservation area (Estonian: Anija botaanilis-maastikuline kaitseala). In 1999 the protected area was designated to the nature reserve.
