= List of film festivals in Italy =

This is a list of film festivals in Italy.

== Italy ==
Name	Est.	City	Type	Details	
4 Film Festival					
A Film for Peace/Un Film per la Pace Festival	2006	Gorizia	International	The film, documentary or fiction, must focus on the theme of peace, wartime conflict, civil war or human rights.	
Borderlands International Film Festival					
CinemadaMare Film Festival	2003			Annual festival for amateur youth filmmakers	
Circuito Off Venice International Short Film Festival		Venice	Special interest		
Communism International Film Festival	2018	Genoa	International	Submit your feature film, short movie or documentary and join the first film festival dedicated to communism and related topics regarding Karl Marx, Friedrich Engels, Rosa Luxemburg, Concetto Marchesi, Antonio Gramsci, Enrico Berlinguer, Leon Trotsky, Ernesto "Che" Guevara and many more...	
DOLOMITALE Filmfestival	2018	Val Gardena South Tyrol		First annual film festival from the Dolomites.	
Fantafestival	1981	Rome	Special interest	Annual festival of science fiction, horror and thriller films.	
Far East Film Festival	1999	Udine	International	The largest showcase of Asian Cinema in the West, held annually at the end of April.	
Festival del Cinema all'Aperto "Accordi @ DISACCORDI"	2000	Naples	Special interest International	Annual three months outdoor Film Festival	
Festival dei Popoli		Florence	Special interest	Annual international documentary festival.	
Festival Internazionale Cinema delle Donne		Turin			
Figari Film Fest	2011	Golfo Aranci, Olbia	International	Annual international festival held in June in the north of Sardinia, devoted to young and independent cinema, to short films and to young directors' debuts. There are prizes for submitted movies and open calls for screenwriters and directors for international development projects.	
First Hermetic International Film Festival	2017	Venice	International	Annual international film festival dedicated to Feature, Short and Documentary in the fields of: Alchemy, Hermetic, Magic, Mystic, Spiritism and much more...	
Flaiano Film Festival	1974	Pescara	International	Held annually. Prizes: films, foreign film, interpreters male and female roles, male and female interpreters, not actors, directors, photographers, editing, soundtrack, set design, costumes. Special jury prize for best film debut. Career award.	
Gaia International Film Festival - Stories of Lands and Food	2021	Salento	International	Gaia International Film Festival is the place to talk about food and its territories, societies and peoples, traditions and memory, culture ... A Festival that aims to promote the territorial identities of the whole world and to enhance their cultures and typicality through the cinematic narration of food and wine traditions.	
Giffoni Film Festival	1971	Giffoni Valle Piana	International	One of the largest film festivals for kids, held annually in July, with short films and features from around the world.	
La Guarimba International Film Festival	2013	Amantea	International	La Guarimba is a film festival situated in the southern Italian region of Calabria with the aim of bringing the cinema back to the people and the people back to the cinema	
Le Giornate del Cinema Muto - aka: Pordenone Silent Film Festival	1982	Pordenone	International	The world most important film festival dedicated to silent cinema, held annually during the first week of October.	
Io Isabella International Film Week	2005		Special interest	Spotlights the work by and about women, particularly documentaries.	
Innuendo International Film Festival	2017	Milan	International	Annual international film festival dedicated to arthouse cinema with its distinct artistic and experimental flavour boosted by the unique independent appeal. Genres: Short film, Feature film, Short documentary, Feature documentary, Music video, Animation or Experimental film in the fields of the unknown and unexpected...	
MYArt Film FEstival	2017	Cosenza, Calabria	International	Films can be submitted into four following cinematographic sections: Documentary Competition, Short Feature Film Competition, Non-profit Short Film Competition. On themes relating to immigration, integration, and cross-cultural exchange in the Mediterranean area.	
Montisi Italian Film Festival	2013	Montisi	Special Interest	Enjoy a mixture of Italian Masters, Italian Contemporary Directors and New Talents.	
Mostra Internazionale del Cinema di Pesaro					
Nòt Film Fest	2018	Santarcangelo di Romagna (RN)	International Independent	Nòt Film Fest is dedicated to great independent films and creating opportunities for their filmmakers. An open air film festival offering a unique festival experience that is more than just outdoor movies.	
No Words International Short Film Festival			Special interest		
Opere Nuove Festival Nazionale del Film Corto					
Ravenna Nightmare Film Festival	2003	Ravenna	Special interest	Annual horror festival.	
Rimusicazioni Festival			Special interest	Add a new soundtrack to an old silent movie.	
Roma Independent Film Festival		Rome	Special interest		
Rome Film Festival		Rome		Held annually in October.	
Salento Film Festival	2004	Tricase	International	Film Festival devoted to international independent cinema. Held annually in September and world tour; Salento Film Festival Hong Kong	
Salerno Film Festival	1945	Salerno	International	First Film Festival in "reduced pitch". Done yearly with movies from 50 countries	
Sentiero Film Factory	2021	Florence	International	Is the first Florentine festival to combine an international short film competition, industry meetings, a screenplay pitch and an artistic residency.	Held annually in May.
Taormina Film Festival	1955	Taormina	International	Held annually. Three separate competitions: Mediterranea, Beyond the Mediterranean and Sicilian Short Film Competition, among a selection of the most important productions of the year.	
Terra di Siena Film Festival	1996	Siena	International	Held annually in September, focusing on independent cinema that treats social and political themes, in particular environmental sustainability.	
TOHorror Film Festival	1999	Turin	International	Annual horror and fantastic festival.	
Trento Film Festival	1952	Trento	Film Festival devoted to mountains, exploration and adventure. Held annually at the end of April		
Trieste Film Festival - Alpe Adria Cinema	1989	Trieste	The leading Italian event on central and eastern European cinema, held annually on the third week of January.		
Trieste Science+Fiction Festival	2000	Trieste	International, Special interest	Held annually in November, it is a multidisciplinary event devoted to the exploration of the realms of the "fantastic" genre	
Torino Film Festival	1982	Turin	International	Held annually in November	
Turin International Lesbian & Gay Film Festival		Turin			
Venice Film Festival	1932	Venice	International	The world's oldest film festival, it is held annually in late August or early September on the island of the Lido.	
Video Festival Imperia	2006	Imperia	International	Held annually in April.	
