= W.C. (film) =

- Directed by: Liam O Mochain
- Written by: Liam O Mochain
- Produced by: Bernie Grummell; Liam O Mochain
- Starring: Liam O Mochain; Julia Wakeham; Adam Goodwin
- Production companies: Siar A Rachas Muid Productions; Hyper Films
- Release date: 23 February 2007 (Dublin)
- Running time: 1:20:00
- Language: English

W.C. is a 2007 Irish independent film about two toilet attendants working in a jazz bar. The film premiered at the 2007 Dublin Film Festival and was screened at several other international film festivals. It won the 'best foreign film' award at the 2009 Las Vegas Film Festival and 'best feature film' at the Waterford Film Festival. The film received a broader release in 2009.
