= European Youth Film Festival =

Film festival

The European Youth Festival (see: List of film festivals in Europe) is a filmfestival made by young people. Every year in February the festival organizes exhibitions of movies and workshops. There are also guests, like directors and actors, who participate in Q&A's after the exhibitions. The mission of the festival is to engage young people to act and think in an artistic setting. JEFF the film microbe is mascot of the festival, he wants to infect everybody by the film virus.

== History ==
=== Start in Antwerp ===
The festival was created in the eighties; the first edition, in 1989 took place in Cinema Cartoon's, Antwerp. Hugo Elsemans was director of the festival en Felix Vanginderhuysen made the program. Since then, the festival has moved to different locations, for example UGC Antwerpen, MUHKA_Media, Cinema Zuid and others.

=== Extension to Bruges ===
In 1999, the festival expanded to Bruges, thanks to a group of youngsters who wanted to use Cinema Lumière as location. Competitions films are still shown there, and also Cinema Liberty is now a location for the festival.

== Films ==
Each year, the festival gives its attention to European films. The films are divided in different categories:

- opening and closing film
- competition feature films
- competition short films
- program for young children
- EXTRAJEFF: premières, favorites of previous editions, documentaries, ...
- Cut the Crap: films selected by youngsters (12+)
- EcoHuis: films that discuss nature, animals, ...

== Jury ==
The jury consist of two parts: a professional jury and a children's jury. Both juries choose a "Best feature film" and a "Best short film". The audience also chooses a best feature film. Every winner gets a JEFFaward, created by a young artist.

== Projects ==
The Youth Film Festival organizes exhibitions at school, takes young people to the Giffoni Film Festival in Italy, ... A particular project is Film Fun in Bed, in collaboration with different hospitals in Flanders: children who cannot leave the hospital can follow the festival online. They also get to nominate their favorite movie.
