= Festival del Cinema all'Aperto "Accordi @ DISACCORDI" =

Film festival in Naples, Italy

Coordinates: 40.86701°N 14.23948°E

- Location: Naples, Italy
- Founded: 2000
- Awards received: "Arena d'essai" from the General Direction for Cinema of the Italian Ministry of Heritage and Culture
- Directors: Pietro Pizzimento
- No. of films: about 60
- Festival date: July - September
- Language: Italian
- Website: http://www.accordiedisaccordi.com

The Outdoor Film Festival "Agreements @ DISAGREE" (Italian: Festival del Cinema all'Aperto "Accordi @ DISACCORDI") is a film festival in Naples, Campania region, Italy.

Film festival created by Pietro Pizzimento and by Associazione Culturale "Movies Events", held in Naples, at the Parco del Poggio, from July to September.

The Festival del Cinema all'Aperto "Accordi @ DISACCORDI" was "Arena d'essai", unique in Campania, from the General Direction for Cinema of the Italian Ministry of Heritage and Culture.

It's sponsored by the Tourism and Major Events Department of the City of Naples and is part of the initiatives of "Summer in Naples".

The exhibition is one of the festival of independent thicker, has a programming most significant films of the season just ended, together with the compilation of the most significant works of contemporary authors or works that have not had adequate distribution of both national and international authors.

== Editions ==
- Festival del Cinema all'Aperto "Accordi @ DISACCORDI" I Edition from July to September 2000
- Festival del Cinema all'Aperto "Accordi @ DISACCORDI" II Edition from July to September 2001
- Festival del Cinema all'Aperto "Accordi @ DISACCORDI" III Edition from July to September 2002
- Festival del Cinema all'Aperto "Accordi @ DISACCORDI" IV Edition from July to September 2003
- Festival del Cinema all'Aperto "Accordi @ DISACCORDI" V Edition from 6 July to 5 September 2004
- Festival del Cinema all'Aperto "Accordi @ DISACCORDI" VI Edition from July to September 2005
- Festival del Cinema all'Aperto "Accordi @ DISACCORDI" VII Edition from 21 July to 12 September 2006
- Festival del Cinema all'Aperto "Accordi @ DISACCORDI" VIII Edition from July to September 2007
- Festival del Cinema all'Aperto "Accordi @ DISACCORDI" IX Edition from 10 July to 16 September 2008
- Festival del Cinema all'Aperto "Accordi @ DISACCORDI" X Edition from 2 July to 13 September 2009
- Festival del Cinema all'Aperto "Accordi @ DISACCORDI" XI Edition from 15 July to 8 September 2010

== See also ==
- Film Festival
- List of film festivals in Italy
- List of film festivals in Europe
- List of film festivals in the World
