= Leiden International Film Festival =

Film festival in Leiden, Netherlands

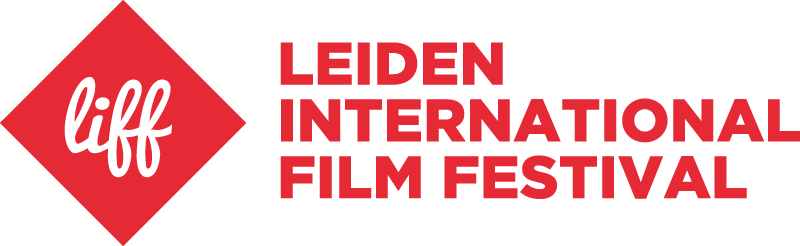
- Location: Leiden, Netherlands
- Founded: 2006
- Directors: Alexander Mouret
- Website: https://www.liff.nl/en/

The Leiden International Film Festival (LIFF) is a film festival based in the Netherlands. The Leiden International Film Festival was founded in 2006 by Alexander Mouret, Michaël Roumen, Michel Zorge, Wouter de Bres and Job Zeestraten.

LIFF screens approximately one hundred films annually across different categories. In addition to film screenings, the festival offers Q&As with filmmakers, special events, and collaborations with cultural institutions in the city. The festival is structured around three central pillars, each with its own competition: Independent (American Indie Competition), Emerging (First Feature Competition), and Extraordinary (Bonkers! Competition).

In addition to (pre-)premieres and new arthouse films, the festival also selects lesser-known independent films, with the aim of providing them access to the European market.

== Programming ==
The program of the Leiden International Film Festival consists of several components, organized around three highlights: Emerging, Independent and Extraordinary.

=== American Indie Competition ===
The American Indie Competition consists of American independent films. The competition focuses on introducing emerging American filmmakers to a Dutch audience.

=== First Feature Competition ===
In the First Feature Competition, LIFF presents international filmmakers with their first feature-length film. The selected films originate from various countries and reflect a range of film styles and perspectives.

=== Bonkers! Competition ===
The Bonkers! Competition focuses on unconventional and experimental films. The selection includes productions that engage with genre conventions and are characterized by their non-traditional approach.

=== Independent: Selections ===
Independent: Selections presents films by established and independent filmmakers. These are often (pre-)premieres that are screened for the first time in the Netherlands or during the festival.

=== Emerging: Selections ===
Emerging: Selections focuses on the work of emerging filmmakers and actors. The selected films are characterized by new perspectives and an independent production context.

=== Extraordinary: Selections ===
Extraordinary: Selections comprises special screenings and events, in which film screenings are combined with additional elements, such as unique locations or live performances.

=== Shorts ===
The shorts programs consist of a selection of short films from various genres. Within this section, several programs are distinguished, including an American Indie program featuring short films by American filmmakers, a Bonkers program with experimental and unconventional productions, and an International program showcasing short films from different countries.

== Summer Special ==
In addition to the annual festival in October and/or November, the Leiden International Film Festival organizes the LIFF Summer Special in the summer. This event consists of a series of open-air screenings held at the Pieterskerkplein in Leiden.

== Locations ==
Film screenings of the Leiden International Film Festival primarily take place in cinemas in the city center of Leiden, including Trianon and Kijkhuis. In addition, the festival programs screenings at other locations in the city, such as cultural institutions and special outdoor venues.

The opening event of the 2013 edition was held in the historic Pieterskerk, where two films by Charlie Chaplin were screened with live musical accompaniment by the Residentieorkest. In 2015, a screening of Spring Breakers took place in a local swimming pool, and in 2016 the festival screened films in the greenhouse of the Hortus botanicus Leiden.

== Education ==
The Leiden International Film Festival organizes educational programs throughout the year for primary and secondary education. During the festival, special school screenings and workshops are offered.

In addition, the festival develops projects aimed at the active participation of students, such as organizing film screenings or festivals by and for young people. Outside the festival period, LIFF also offers educational activities in collaboration with schools and cultural institutions in the region.

== Opening films and prize winners ==
Year	Opening film	Competition	Winner
2006	The Black Dahlia	-	-
2007	American Gangster	-	-
2008	W.	-	-
2009	The Informant!	-	-
2010	You Will Meet a Tall Dark Stranger	Iron Herring	(Untitled)
2011	Margin Call	Iron Herring	Avé
2012	Argo	Iron Herring	Safety Not Guaranteed
2013	The Immigrant & The Pilgrim	American Indie Competition:	Short Term 12
2014	Whiplash	American Indie Competition: Audience Award:	Whiplash; Pride
2015	Steve Jobs (film)	American Indie Competition: Audience Award:	Me and Earl and the Dying Girl Le tout nouveau Testament
2016	Arrival	American Indie Competition: Audience Award:	Burn Your Maps Toni Erdmann
2017	Suburbicon	American Indie Competition: Audience Award:	Menashe; Vele hemels boven de zevende
2018	American Animals	American Indie Competition: Audience Award:	Leave No Trace; Werk ohne Autor
2019	Jojo Rabbit	American Indie Competition: Audience Award:	The Peanut Butter Falcon; Hors Normes
2020	Nomadland, Supernova, Save Yourselves!, Las Niñas, Wildland, Yallah! Underground	American Indie Competition: Audience Award:	Nomadland; Supernova
2021	Ich bin dein Mensch	American Indie Competition: Audience Award: First Feature Competition:	Mass; Maixabel; Death of a virgin, and the sin of not living
2022	The Banshees of Inisherin	American Indie Competition: Audience Award: First Feature Competition:	Vengeance; Rose; Everybody hates Johan
2023	Dream Scenario	American Indie Competition: Publieksprijs: First Feature Competition: Bonkers Competition:	Starring Jerry as Himself Radical 20,000 Species of Bees Humanist Vampire Seeking Consenting Suicidal Person
2024	My Old Ass	American Indie Competition: Publieksprijs: First Feature Competition: Bonkers Competition:	Ghostlight Kneecap Just a Couple of Days Kneecap
2025	Splitsville	American Indie Competition: Publieksprijs: First Feature Competition: Bonkers Competition:	Plainclothes All That's Left of You Julian Secret Mall Apartment

== European Network for Independent American Cinema ==
In 2014, LIFF launched the European Network for Independent American Cinema in collaboration with the American Film Festival in Poland. Its mission is to promote American Independent productions throughout Europe. The Network works to fulfil this mission through its film festival members in Europe and its supporting partners in Asia and North America.

All the participating film festivals are platforms for American independent films in their respective regions. They all work closely within the Network, but embody diversity and individual artistic identity, through their distinct programming choices. They feature both press and audience screenings and offer a side events including classes, conferences and industry pitching, bringing together a wide spectrum of viewers an industry professionals to share experiences and knowledge.

== See also ==
- Leiden International Short Film Festival
