= Brest European Short Film Festival =

Annual short film festival in France

Coordinates: 48°23′21″N 4°29′7″W

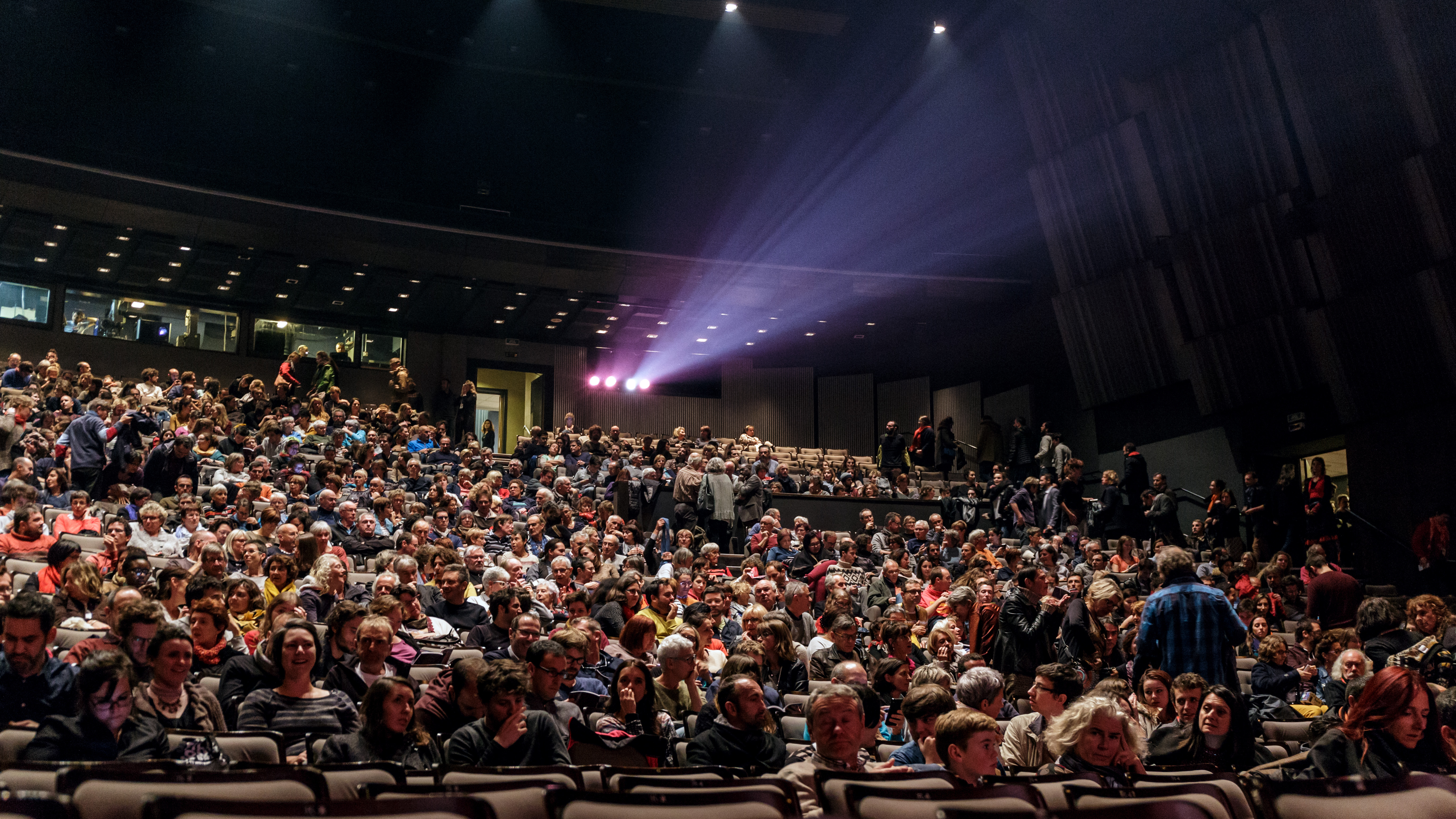
- The Quartz Theater in Brest
- Location: Brest (Brittany), France
- Founded: 1986; 40 years ago
- Most recent: 8–13 November 2022
- Awards: Grand Prix du film court
- Hosted by: Côte Ouest Association
- No. of films: about 200 each year
- Language: International
- Website: filmcourt.fr

The Brest European Short Film Festival (French: Festival européen du film court de Brest) is a film festival dedicated to short films, happening every year in Brest, in the Brittany region in France. It has been organized by the Côte Ouest Association since 1987 and is open to everyone, school groups and professionals.

Since 1992, films from all over Europe are competing at the festival to light and wins recognition for the viewpoint of young European filmmakers. Prizes are awarded by several jurys. Besides the official selection, several themed screenings and workshops are dedicated to the young audience.

Known as the second best short film festival in France, Brest unites around 30,000 professionals and filmgoers.

== History ==
=== Beginnings ===
In 1984, Brest film director Olivier Bourbeillon organizes a short film night at the Mac Orlan theater. In 1986, Gilbert Le Traon, who became director of Brittany Film Archive in 2000, joins Olivier Bourbeillon in the organization of the first edition of " Brest Short Film Festival ". The festival lasts three days and two nights during springtime. Five programmes and around two dozens French speaking films are screened at the Mac Orlan theater gathering an audience of around 700 people. In 1987, the newly created Association Côte Ouest takes over the organization of the event.

=== Competition ===
British films enter the selection starting 1989 enabling the creation of the European competition in 1992. Starting 1995, the festival strengthens its European dimension by inviting a new European country each year and doing numerous screenings focusing on a specific country. This is how many exchanges with European cities such as Hamburg (Germany), Vila do Conde (Portugal), Tampere (Finland) happened.

From 1999, the Estran contest supports screenwriting of short fictions and helps Breton directors.

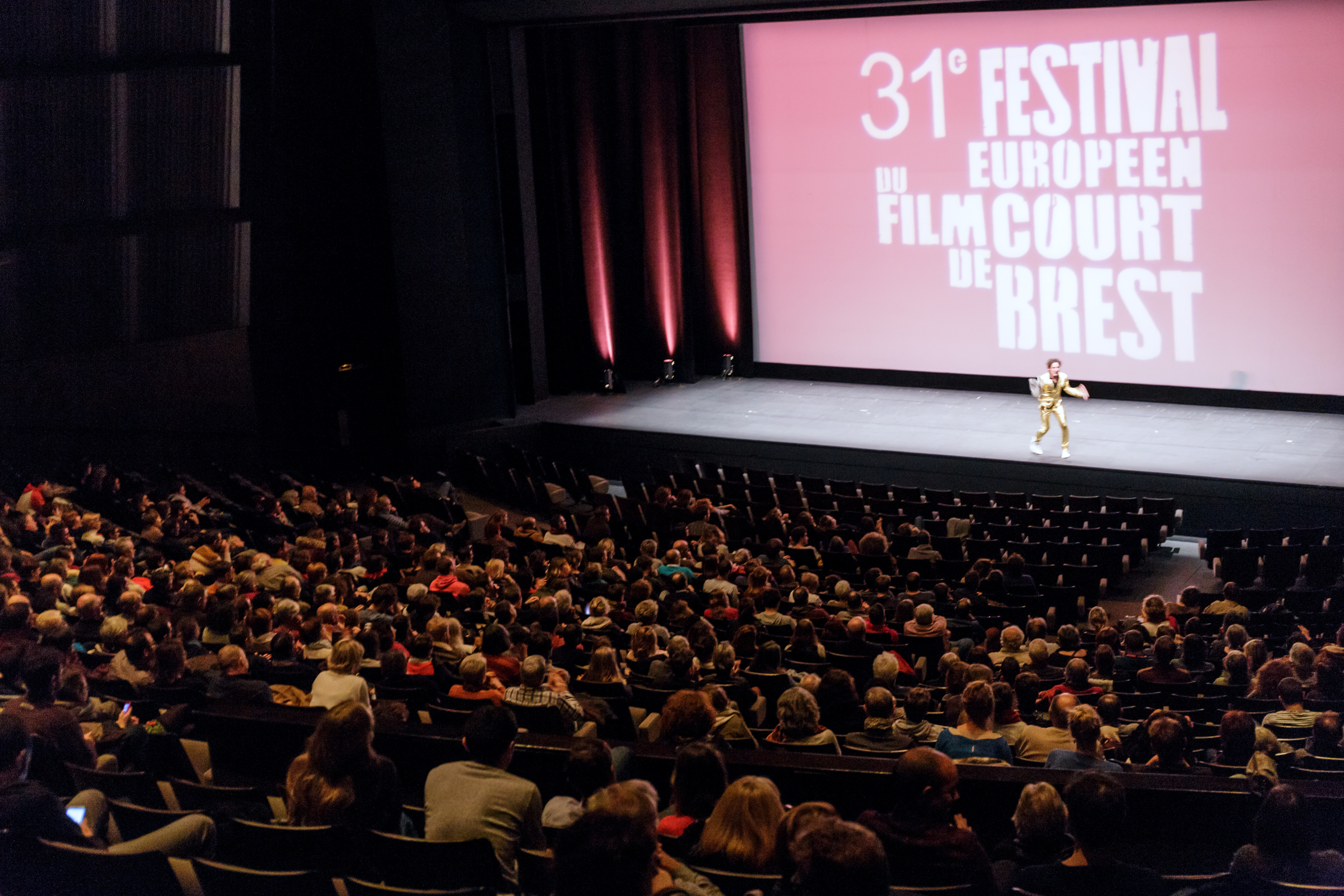
Opening Night of the festival in 2016

=== Attendance ===
In 1989, the Quartz national stage hosts for the first time the festival gathering 6,000 viewers. In 1995, celebrating its 10th anniversary, the festival gets past 17,000 viewers. In 2005, festival goers celebrate the 20th anniversary of the event. In 2013, 14,000 young audience entries are recorded. For the 30th edition, the festival aims at 30,000 entries is six days and in 2016 around 28,000 entries are counted.

=== Celebrities ===
Claude Zidi is the first president of the festival's jury. Among its most well-known guests, the festival hosted Joris Ivens, Michelangelo Antonioni, Mathilda May, Hilton McConnico, Hippolyte Girardot, Marion Cotillard, Sylvie Testud, Élisabeth Depardieu, Peter Mullan, Richard Bohringer, Vincent Lindon, Gérard Darmon, Caroline Loeb, Bernard-Pierre Donnadieu, René Vautier, Véronique Jannot, Pascal Légitimus, François Ozon, Keren Ann and Breton artists Étienne Daho and Yelle.

=== Discoveries ===
The festival has enabled the highlighting of numerous directors who then got involved in making successful feature films such as Arnaud Desplechin, Cédric Klapisch, Éric Rochant, Jean-Pierre Jeunet, Mathieu Kassovitz, François Ozon, Pascale Breton, Fred Cavayé, Gérald Hustache-Mathieu, etc.

== Organization ==
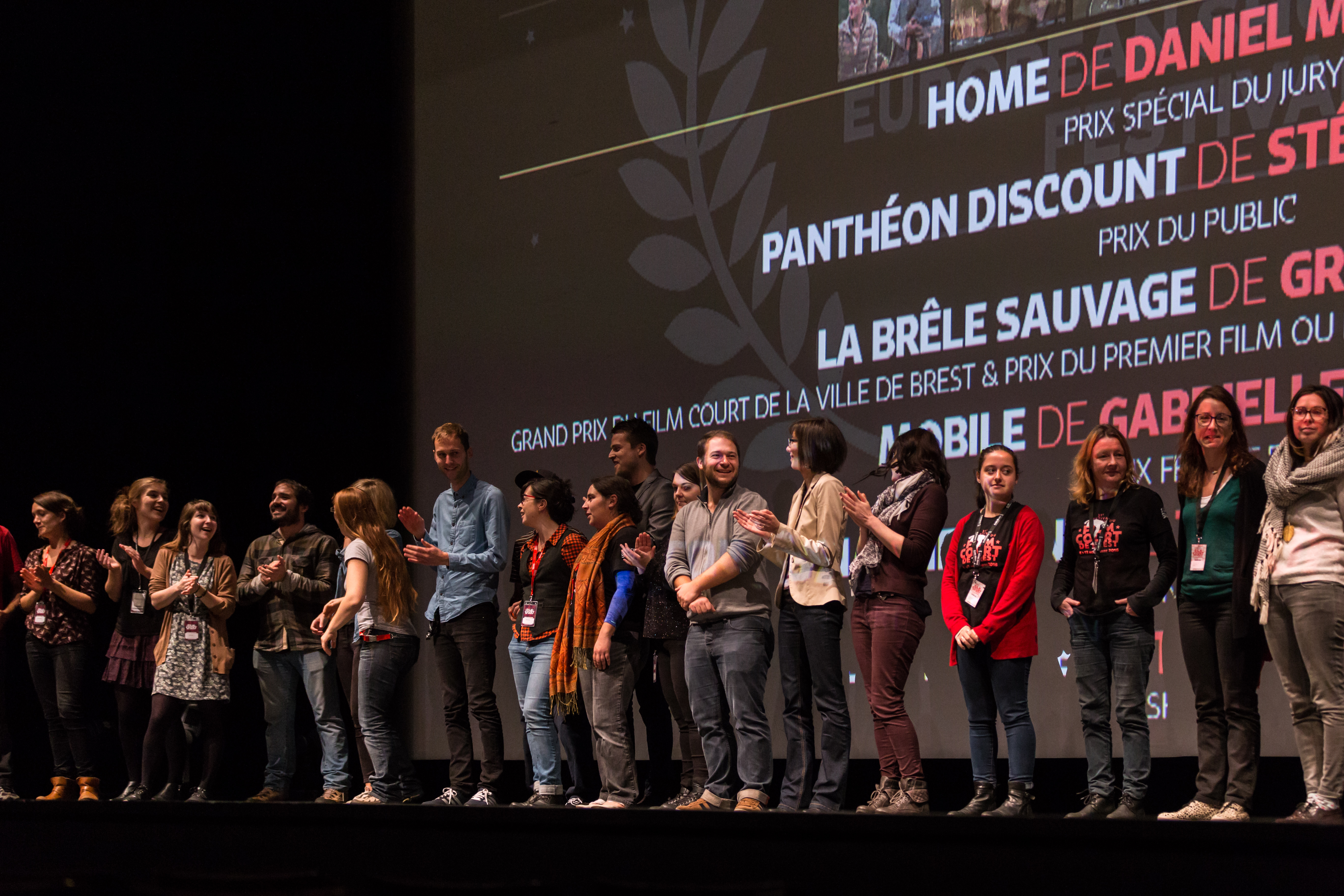
The organizing team on stage

=== Côte Ouest Association ===
The festival is organized by the Côte Ouest Association which was created in 1986. The event is part of its main missions which are the broadcasting of films mostlyshorts and image education mainly for the young audience. For ten years, from 1996 to 2007, Côte Ouest oversees the national Cinéville system " Un été au ciné " with outdoors screenings. The festivals aims at promoting young filmmakers both European and French as well as introducing the widest audience possible with cinema.

=== Official selection ===
After eight years as artistic director of the festival, Olivier Bourbeillon hands over to Gilbert Le Traon and Mirabelle Fréville. When they leave in 2001, the artistic direction becomes collective and is handled by a total of seven people. Starting 2007, selection committees watch all the submitted films. Between 2009 and 2013, the organization reaches out to Bernard Boulad to be the artistic director of the festival. From 2011 to 2015, Massimiliano Nardulli takes care of the programmation searching for emergent talents and European productions all year. He is replaced in 2016 by Arthur Lemasson.

The festival only accepts fiction films for the official competition and the short films must not be over 30 minutes-long. The French competition features first films or school films only. Around 2,000 films are submitted and 200 to 250 are screened at the festival. 70% of those films come from all over Europe and 25 to 30 European countries are represented. A total of 70 films are part of the different competitions of the festival while 40 films compete in the European section.

=== Sections ===
The official competition separates European productions from French cinema. Until 2012, the " Cocotte-minute " competition screened films inferior to six minutes. Since 2013, the " OVNI " competition (UFO competition) rewards the uniqueness and creativity of films included in a special programme.

There are also special screenings and themed screenings such as the "Made in Breizh", that is to say films produced and/or directed in Brittany. Besides the competitions, the Midnight Show section is dedicated to the genre movies, the Brest Off section also presents the audience with several genres since 1993. The Panorama Animation is dedicated to European animation films. Three or four programmes are dedicated to the young audience (starting age two).

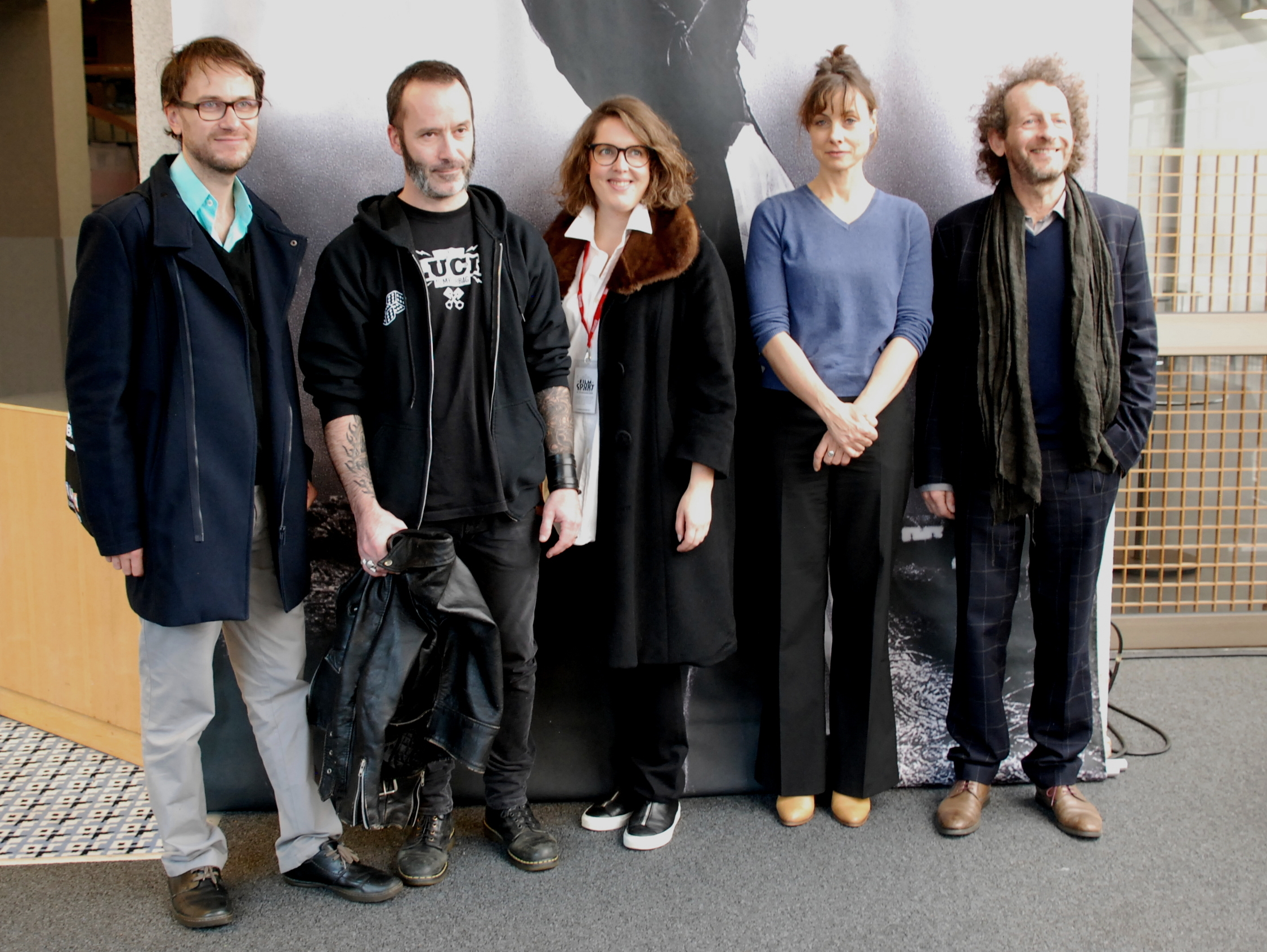
Jury of the 31st edition in 2016.

=== Jury's constitution ===
The festival's jury is made up of five people. The personalities appointed come from different cinema backgrounds and they award four to five prizes.

The "passeurs de courts" jury promotes short films in 39 Breton cinemas. The young jury is made up of students specialized in cinema. The press jury gathers local and national journalists, the France 2 jury is made up of professionals of France Télévisions. The Beaumarchais-SACD foundation also awards a prize as well as the audience by filling out voting papers at the end of each screening.

=== Awards ===
The official jury awards the " Grand prix du film court " as well as several other awards : a European prize, a first film prize and a special prize. The France 2 and the Beaumarchais prizes award films from the French competition. One film from the OVNI competition gets a prize from the ShortsTV channel and the SundanceTV channel awards one film of the Brest OFF competition.

== Around the Festival ==
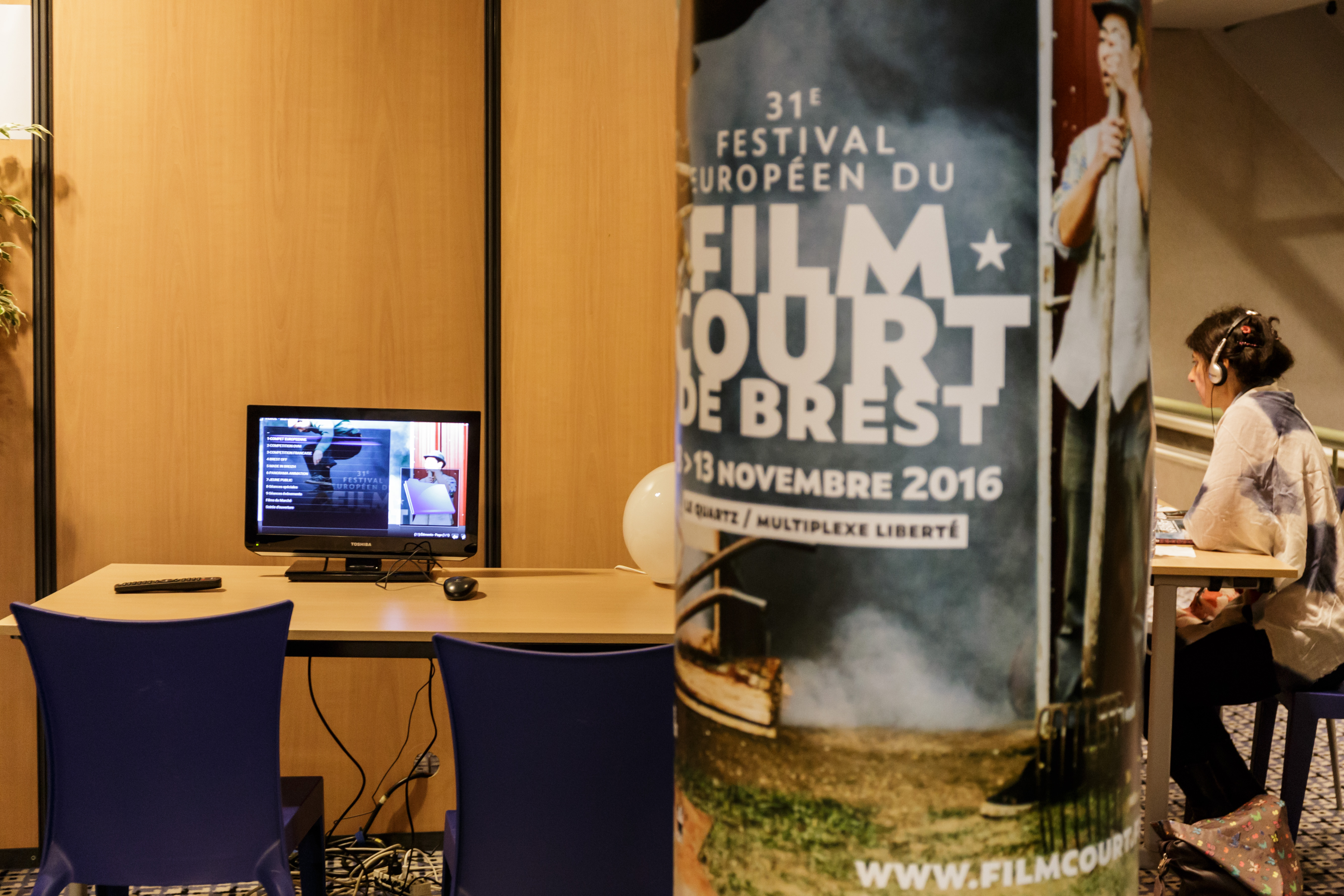
Space dedicated to the film market

=== Reach ===
The Festival is considered to be one of the most important short film festivals in France, coming second in terms of entries. It screens a selection of films coming from European countries such as Norway, Switzerland, Iceland or Eastern countries.

Around 500 professionals attend and 200 volunteers are involved in the festival. Since 1997, the festival's film market gathers a selection of 300 films made available to professionals all week long.

=== Medias ===
In 1990, French partners get involved enabling the festival to grow : the Gan Foundation for cinema, Kodak (photography prize) and "Histoires Courtes" on Antenne 2. TV channels buy some awarded films and promote the festival in special programmes such as Court Circuit on the Arte channel, "CineCinecourt" on CinéCinéma, "Comme au cinéma" and "Histoires Courtes" on the France 2 channel. The Festival also had among its partners Canal +, France 3 and Arte. In 2014, the partnership with Canal + gets replaced by the ShortsTV channel dedicated to short films.

== See also ==
- List of film festivals in Europe
- Brest, France - Finistère, Brittany
