= Kastav Film Festival =

Kastav Film Festival is an international film festival founded in 2009. Since then, the festival is held every June in Kastav, Croatia.

The festival shows all of the submitted films and has no jury.

== Manifest ==
To read about KFF manifest follow this link

== See also ==
- List of film festivals in Europe
