= Salerno Film Festival =

Annual film festival in Salerno, Italy

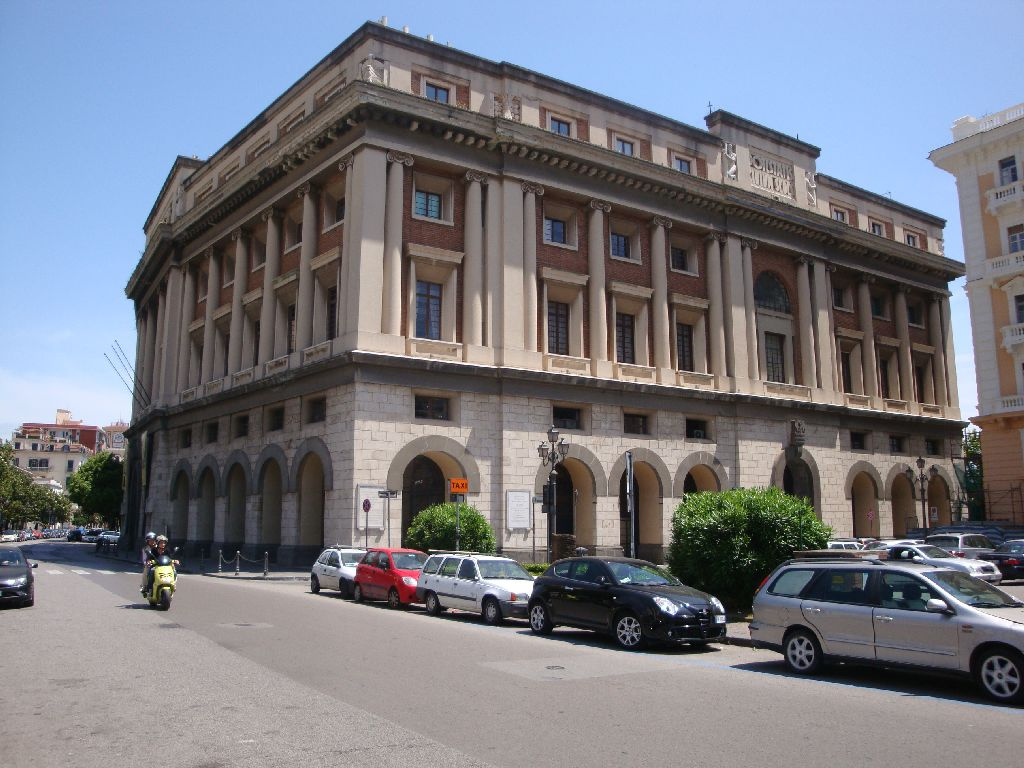
- The festival takes place in Augusteo cinema, located in the municipality of Salerno.
- Location: Salerno, Italy
- Founded: 1946; 80 years ago
- Website: festivaldelcinema.it

Salerno Film Festival (Italian: Festival Internazionale del Cinema di Salerno) is a film festival that has operated since 1946 in Salerno, Italy.

== History ==
"Cine Club Salerno", a non-profit association of cinematographic culture, was born in 1945 from a group of friends which had an ambitious program: promoting culture through cinema. Thus, in 1946, the 1st National Exhibition of Cinema a Passo Ridotto was born.

In 1945, a group of friends united by a deep passion founded the Cine Club Salerno, a non-profit cultural association with an ambitious goal: to promote culture through the power of moving images. The following year, in 1946, this vision took shape in the 1st Mostra Nazionale Del Cinema A Passo Ridotto, the pioneering event that, growing year after year, would eventually become the Salerno Film Festival.

— Festival Internazionale del Cinema di Salerno

The Salerno Film Festival had its first edition in 1946, when it happened to be the first festival of the so-called movement of "reduced step", that lowered all 35 mm movies to 16 mm ones, for easier distribution.

That historical edition was attended, among others, by Vittorio De Sica, Rossano Brazzi, Adriana Benetti, Maria Mercader and Mariella Lotti. On that occasion, the projections were held not only in Salerno, but also in Cava de' Tirreni, Positano and Amalfi.

Since its first edition, the festival has been held annually (with the exception of the 1953, 1957, 1959 and 1960 editions). The location is at the cinema Augusteo, located at the ground floor of the northern Palazzo di Città ("The Salerno Town Hall") and even sometimes at the Salerno's Teatro Verdi.

== Innovations for film standards ==
The Festival gave useful innovations to the cinema industry:

Even in the cold halls of the Salerno hospitals, the enterprising founders, Ignazio Rossi, Matteo Della Corte, Achille Guglielmi and others, in carrying out their medical and surgical professions, did not forget the cinema; thus, now masters of the camera, they used it as a tool to deepen their operational techniques, taking advantage of a detailed vision of the work carried out and thus opening passionate discussions among themselves on how to improve and perfect their own activity. What was born without intending it will then be exported everywhere: the audiovisual training method. Salerno, cradle of the "Medical School", launched to the world a new means of theoretical/practical didactic study. Over the years, then, the Cine Club Salerno became a point of reference not only for world cinematography, but also for the decisions of a revolutionary nature in the technical field that were established in the world conferences, held in Salerno, by the photo and cinematographic companies. In fact, the new film standards were established in Salerno: from 8 to Super8, the placing on the market of disposable cameras and many other innovations that are still used today by all photocinema enthusiasts.BD

The 2021 edition saw the participation of 350 films in competition from 50 countries and was internationally famous.

The 76th event of the Salerno Film Festival was held from 28 November to 3 December 2022, at the CineTeatro Augusteo and in various locations in Salerno. The Sections of the competitions were: Feature and short films, Fiction, Film Dossier, Cartoons, Commercials, Video clips and Smartphone films, Videscuola, Discovery Campania, Environment, Soundtracks, Cinema for a book – a book for Cinema and Documentaries with various Sections of specialized Cinematographies.

== Bibliography ==
- Kathryn Bowser, AIVF Guide to International Film and Video Festivals A Fully Indexed Guide to Over 370 Festivals Worldwide, Featuring Reprints of the Festival Column of The Independent from March 1986 to April 1988, Foundation for Independent Video and Film, Incorporated (1988).
- Annuario del Cinema Italiano & Audiovisivi 2022. Centro Studi di Cultura, Promozione e Diffusione del Cinema (2022).

== See also ==
- List of film festivals in Italy
