= Bór Zapilski =

- Village
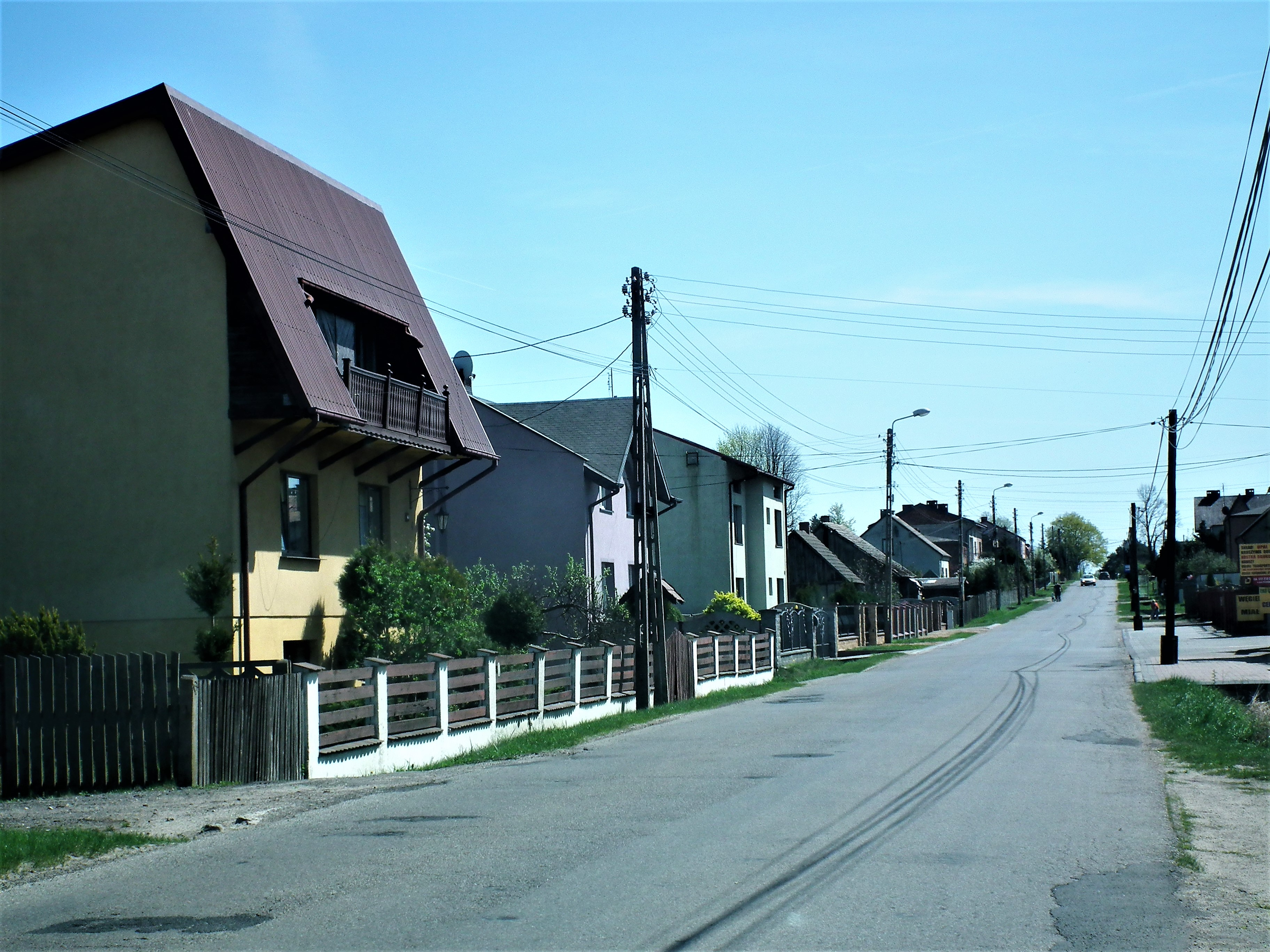

- Location within Poland
- Coordinates: 50°49′N 18°50′E
- Country: Poland
- Voivodeship: Silesian
- County: Kłobuck
- Gmina: Wręczyca Wielka
- Population: 369

Bór Zapilski (Polish pronunciation: [ˈbur zaˈpilskʲi]) is a village in the administrative district of Gmina Wręczyca Wielka, within Kłobuck County, Silesian Voivodeship, in southern Poland.

== Culture ==
The International Random Film Festival was hosted in Bór Zapilski in July 2011.
