= Alexander Mouret =

Dutch cultural entrepreneur

Alexander Mouret (born 14 May 1979) is a Dutch lawyer and cultural entrepreneur, with a special interest in the interplay between technology and the visual arts. He is one of the founders and was, until 2021, director of the Leiden International Film Festival and founding director of “Brave New World”; a conference that aims to bridge the gap between academia and the (visual) arts and to look at how future technologies will impact human life. In September 2021, Mouret announced that he would step down as director of the Leiden International Film Festival, stating that, after his 16 year tenure, it was time for a new generation of film-lovers at the helm of the festival. His role in the development of Leiden University’s Artificial Intelligence programme, and a number of other projects (including Brave New World), moreover, demanded more time.

== Career ==
Mouret studied art history and law at Leiden University. In addition to his role as director of the Leiden International Film festival, Mouret has organized a number of other cultural initiatives, including ‘Brave New World’ (a festival that serves as a platform for both academics and artists to discuss challenges and opportunities that may arise as a result of technological advances). In his capacity as manager for regional partnering at Leiden University, he is involved in various other regional and national cultural events and organisations, and serves as a member of the jury for the Icarus Award (for young artists who successfully span the fields of visual arts and technology) and as a member of the Supervisory Board of the Museon; a The Hague-based museum focusing on art and technology. He is frequently considered one of the most influential professionals in the art and cultural sector in the Leiden area.

Mouret has published or edited a number of volumes, articles and op-eds on topics that relate to subjects discussed at Brave New World, including the book Brave New Human (co-edited with Kim van den Wijngaard and Jorrit Kelder), and, in 2020, "Brave New Human: Reflections om the Invisible": on that year's COVID-19 crisis and how societies of the future may cope with similar events. This book received mixed reviews, with one reviewer praising the fact that the book was freely available (online), whilst criticizing the volume’s lack of focus. With Alla Vein he published a paper in The Lancet (neurology) on Anatomical peculiarities in Renaissance paintings. In 2022, Mouret, together with Fresco Sam-Sin, published the volume “Misleiden: schatten van verwarring”; a book that accompanied the exhibition “MISLEIDEN” (a pun on the Dutch verb “misleiden”, to fool, and the city of Leiden, where the exhibition was held) online and at Museum de Lakenhal.
