= Raketfilm =

Swedish short film festival in Karlstad, Värmland County

Raketfilm (the Rocket Film Festival) is a Swedish short films festival held annually in the city of Karlstad, since 2001, by Film i Värmland. It is a movie-making contest where independent filmmakers have to make a 3-minute short movie in just one weekend. The filmmakers get the rules on Film i Värmlands homepage on a Saturday and then they have one day of making a short movie. The Sunday that follows, the movies must be finished and they are shown to an audience and a jury for judging. There's 1st, 2nd, 3rd prize and an Audience Award.

== Winners ==
=== 2012 ===
- 1st prize Käre Seppo
- 2nd prize Perrong C
- 3rd prize Slut
- Audience Award Yolo

=== 2010 ===
- 1st prize Backdoor plumbing
- 2nd prize O va´
- 3rd prize Censur
- Audience Award O va´

=== 2009 ===
- 1st prize En tôcken där - Bôttennapp
- 2nd prize Psykbryt
- 3rd prize En annan kärlekshistoria
- Audience Award UFO-klubben
- Honorary Award UFO-klubben
- Honorary Award I öknen är pärlor inget värda
- Honorary Award Shake off - the Revenge of Michael Flyers

=== 2007 ===
- 1st prize Jag har verkligen försökt, baby
- 2nd prize den nye
- 3rd prize Nej, inte skjuta Rufus
- Audience Award Gårdstagen

=== 2006 ===
- No festival this year

=== 2005 ===
- 1st prize En långvarig försäljning
- 2nd prize E211
- 3rd prize Baktankar
- Audience Award En långvarig försäljning

=== 2004 ===
- 1st prize Magnus Mindville
- 2nd prize Smidigt Thord
- 3rd prize Förbannelsen
- Audience Award Magnus Mindville

=== 2003 ===
- 1st prize Praktikanten
- 2nd prize Sharre
- 3rd prize EvOL
- Audience Award Sharre

=== 2002 ===
- 1st prize Invigningen
- 2nd prize Beam me up, Scotty
- 3rd prize Punching Tiger, Singing Women
- Audience Award Invigningen

=== 2001 ===
- 1st prize Ne me moleste mosquito
