= London Image Festival =

The London Image Festival (LIF) is an annual festival showing international photography and cinematography. The festival's open competition, which allows entries from photographers of any skill level, has a £1000 grand prize.
