= Leiden Shorts =

Film festival in Leiden, Netherlands

[[Nguyễn Tiến Hoàng (Người dẫn chương trình)]]

Leiden Shorts is an annual short film festival held in the city of Leiden, The Netherlands. Leiden Shorts (previously known as Leiden International Short Film Experience) was founded in 2009 as a cineclub and has grown to become one of the Netherlands' largest international short film festivals.

== History ==
Founded in 2009, LISFE (Leiden International Short Film Experience) was created by 5 cinema-loving expats. While they were studying at Leiden University, the first and oldest university in the Netherlands, they felt that short film was grossly underrepresented as an art form and sought to create a space where short film could truly be appreciated as a medium.

Today, what was originally a one-day festival has grown into Leiden Shorts, one of the most prominent short film festivals in the Netherlands. Fourteen editions later, the now 4-day festival has gone from screenings in Leiden’s underground art spaces to collaborations co-hosted by Leiden’s cinemas.

Next to the main festival, Leiden Shorts is involved in cultural events throughout the year in collaboration with several organisations in Leiden and its surroundings. Examples are Leiden International Film Festival (LIFF), Leiden Observatory, RAP, Vrijplaats Leiden, Cultuurmaand, Nacht van Ondekkingen, PLNT, Wibar, and Museumnacht Leiden.

Leiden Shorts is a member of Talking Shorts.

In 2025, Leiden Shorts hosts the European Short Pitch Co-Production Forum.

== Jury, Competitions and Awards ==
Since 2012, the festival has had three categories of awards – General Award, Student Award, and Audience Award. In 2020, a National Award was created, and the General Award was renamed the International Award. The juries for the National, International, and Student Awards are generally composed of scholars, filmmakers, and other film professionals alike. The audience votes during the festival, and the results are announced on the last day of the festival. During the festival's retrospective edition in 2023, the Retrospective Audience Award was awarded to three films with the highest audience rating.

Since the 2024 edition, the festival has three competitions: International, National, and Brand New Eyes. The Brand New Eyes Competition, formerly known as the Student Competition, also includes debut films that were created outside of the academic context, thereby highlighting short films by emerging voices in the industry.

== Festival Editions ==
=== 1st Edition: 29 May 2009 ===
- Best Professional Film Jury Award: Spitted by Kiss (dir. Milos Tomić), Czech Republic
- Best Professional Film Audience Award: Tanghi argentiny (dir. Guy Thys), Belgium

=== 2nd Edition: 28–30 May 2010 ===
- Best Professional Film Jury Award: Efecto Domino (dir. Gagriel Gauchet), Cuba and Germany
- Best Professional Film Audience Award: Edgar (dir. Fabian Busch), Germany

=== 3rd Edition: 10 June 2011 ===
- Best Professional Film Jury Award: Casus Belli (dir. Yorgos Zoi), Greece
- Best Professional Film Audience Award: Teclópolis (dir. Javier Mrad), Argentina
- Best Student film Audience Award: Bastagon and the Rainbow Princess (dir. Marc Schlegel), Austria
- Jury Honorable Mention: Air (dir. Fabrizio Fracassi and Florian Graf), Switzerland

=== 4th Edition: 9 June 2012 ===
- Best Professional Film Jury Award: Bread (Ekmek) (dir. Koray Sevindi), Turkey
- Best Professional Film Audience Award: The Hour's Home (A Casa das Horas) (dir. Heraldo Cavalcanti), Brazil
- Best Student film Audience Award: Assemblé (dir. Miguel Ferraez from Universidad Anahuac), Mexico
- Best Student film Jury Mention: Grandmothers (Abuelas) (dir. Afarin Eghbal from the National Film & Television School), UK
- Jury Honorable Mention: The Counting Device (Numărătoarea manuală) (dir. Daniel Sandu), Romania
- Jury Honorable Mention: The Star (Hviezda) (dir. Andrej Kolencik), Slovakia

=== 5th Edition: 1–8 June 2013 ===
- Best Film Jury Prize: DYKWLI (Do you know what love is) (dir. Leni Huyghe), Belgium, 2012
- Best Film Audience Award: Los Retratos (Portraits) (dir. Iván D. Gaona), Colombia, 2012
- Beste Student Film Juryprijs: Adem'in kuyusu (Well of adem) (dir. Veysel Cihan Hızar), Turkey, 2012
- Jury Honorable Mention: Marze shekaste (Broken border) (dir. Keywan Karimi), Iran, 2012

=== 6th Edition: 1–3 May 2014 ===
- Held at Scheltema Leiden
- General Award: Baghdad Messi (dir. Sahim Omar Kalifa), United Arab Emirates and Belgium, 2013

=== 7th Edition: 30 April–2 May 2015 ===
- Held at Meelfabriek Leiden
- Audience Award: Mama Agatha (dir. Fadi Hindash), Netherlands, 2014
- General Award: Symphony no. 42 (dir. Réka Bucsi), Hungary, 2014

=== 8th Edition: 29–30 April 2016 ===
- Held at Haagwegvier Leiden
- Audience Award: Within Four Walls (dir. Hyo Kaag), Netherlands, 2015
- General Award: Allegory of the Jam Jar (dir, Boris Kuijpers & Ruth Mellaerts), Belgium, 2015

=== 9th Edition:13–14 May 2017 ===
- Held at Het Leidse Volkshuis
- Student Award: Digital Immigrants (dir. Dennis Stauffer & Nortbert Kottmann), Switzerland, 2016
- Audience Award: Watu Wote (All of us) (dir. Katja Benrath), Germany, 2016
- General Award: Il Silenzio (dir. Ali Asgari), Italy and France, 2016

=== 10th Edition: 11–13 May 2018 ===
- Held at Kijkhuis
- Student Award: Fast Alles (dir. Lisa Gertsch), Switzerland 2017
- Audience Award: Why I Wrote The Bible (Pourquoi J'ai écrit la Bible) (dir. Alexandre Steiger), France, 2017
- General Award: 5 Years After The War (Cinq ans après la guerre) (dir. Samuel Albaric, Martin Wiklund, Ulysse Lefort), France, 2017

=== 11th Edition: 9–12 May 2019 ===
- Held at Kijkhuis
- Student Award: Weltschmerz (dir. Jesper Dalgaard), Denmark, 2018
- Audience Award: The Fathers Love Begotten (dir. Ian Thomas Ash), Japan, 2019
- General Award: Between the Shadows (dir. Alice Guimarães & Mónica Santos), France and Portugal, 2018

=== 12th Edition: 10–13 September 2020 ===
- Held at Kijkhuis
- Theme: Climate (In)Justice
- Student Award: Here and There (dir. Melisa Liebenthal), France and Argentina, 2019
- National Award: Baba (dir. Sarah Blok & Lisa Konno), Netherlands, 2019
- Audience Award: Invisível Herói (Invisible Hero) (dir. Cristèle Alves Meira), Portugal, 2019
- International Award: Carne (Flesh) (dir. Camila Kater), Brazil, 2019

=== 13th Edition: 2–5 September 2021 ===
- Held at Kijkhuis
- Theme: Rooted: Dutch Multicultural Society
- Student Award: Filipiñana (dir. Rafael Manuel), Philippines and UK, 2020
- National Award: Dear Chaemin (dir. Cyan Bae), Netherlands, 2020
- Audience Award: White Eye (dir. Tomer Shushan), Israel, 2020
- International Award: Heaven Reaches Down the Earth (dir. Tebogo Malebogo), South Africa, 2020

=== 14th Edition: 9–12 June 2022 ===
- Held at Kijkhuis
- Theme: Between Fact and Fiction
- Student Award: Ob Scena (dir. Paloma Orlandini Castro), Argentina, 2021
- National Award: Minimal Sway While Starting My Way Up (dir. Stéphanie Lagarde), Netherlands, 2021
- Audience Award: From the Balcony (dir. Aris Kaplanidis), Greece, 2021
- International Award: It’s Raining Frogs Outside (dir. Maria Estela Paiso), Philippines, 2022

=== 15th Edition: 14–16 September 2023 ===
- Held at Kijkhuis and Nobel
- Theme: Re-Thinking | Re-Showing
- Retrospective Audience Award (the three films with the highest audience rating, in alphabetical order): Love, Dad (dir. Diana Cam Van Nguyen), Czech Republic, 2021 | My Uncle Tudor (dir. Olga Lucovnicova), Belgium, Portugal, Hungary and Moldova, 2021 | Sisters (dir. Katarina Rešek Kukla), Slovenia, 2021

=== 16th Edition: 6–9 June 2024 ===
- Held at Kijkhuis and PLNT
- Programme text: "Leiden Shorts returns for a rejuvenated edition featuring 138 films from 53 countries. This year’s programme focuses on the spaces where novel ideas and original perspectives take shape. We wish to observe the world and our society in its raw and true colours, exploring through the richness and diversity of the short film format alternative views on the current state of affairs, censorship, and colonial legacies. In a global state of constant flux, which has also found our festival in a transformative period, we invite audiences to reflect on notions of growth, fluidity, and change."
- Award Winners:
  - International Competition: "For here am I sitting in a tin can far above the world", dir. Gala Hernández López
  - National Competition: "You can’t get what you want, but you can get me", dir. Samira Elagoz and Z. Walsh
  - Brand New Eyes Competition: "3MWh", dir. Marie-Magdalena Kochová
  - Audience Award: "The Passion According to Karim", dir. Axel Würsten

=== 17th Edition: 30 May–3 June 2025 ===
- Held at Kijkhuis and PLNT
- Theme: Does Size Matter?
- Programme text: "As a short film festival, we can’t help but think about size. In a world obsessed with scale and the belief that bigger is better, we’re flipping the script: Can small things create a big impact? What is the power of small gestures, grassroots movements—or even a short film? How does screen size or film length affect the way we experience stories? This year, Leiden Shorts explores scale in all its forms, from no-budget gems and tiny screens to marathon runtimes and fleeting moments, challenging our assumptions about storytelling, time, and significance. Leiden Shorts returns in 2025 to once again transform the city into a dynamic hub for short-form cinema. Over five days, the festival will showcase more than 120 carefully selected films from over 45 countries, drawn from over 1,400 submissions. With a vibrant programme of competition screenings, exhibitions, thematic explorations, and in-depth discussions, Leiden Shorts continues to foster emerging talent, broaden perspectives, and create meaningful connections between filmmakers and audiences."
