= Extravagant India - International Indian Film Festival (Paris) =

Extravagant India -International Indian Film Festival Paris
- Location: Paris, France
- Language: International
- Website: www.extravagantindia.fr

Extravagant India is an annual film festival held in Paris, France. The festival began in 2013 in order to promote Indian films in France. Founding members include Gabriele Brennan, Manoj Srivastava, Ramesh Tekwani, Pierre Assouline, Ranvir Nayar, Patricia Soreau, Francois Vila, and Benoit Delpace.

"Extravagant India !" features films from multiple regions of India, with a focus on original content.

The festival emphasizes featuring new talent and highlights India's diversity. In 2014, five of the nine films in competition were the directors' first films. In 2015, the festival featured films from more than eight different regions and filmed in eight original languages (Hindi, Marathi, Bengali, Gujarati, Himachali, Tamil, Malayalam and Kashmiri).

In the first year of the festival, 2013, the Best Film Award was given to the film "The Lunchbox" by the Indian filmmaker Ritesh Batra.
