= Meniscus Film Festival =

The Meniscus Film Festival is an annual event which takes place in Grimsby, North East Lincolnshire, England. Based at the Whitgift Film Theatre (Whitgift School) in Grimsby the festival screens a range of independent films and has been running since 2001. The Festival regularly shows locally produced films.

Various fringe events also take place at separate venues in the region during the festival and a number of other film-based activities are run throughout the year. The festival includes a competition for film makers to make a film under 5 minutes in duration based upon a creative title. The winner of the competition receives an award and a cash prize.

It is organised on a voluntary basis and funding is sourced from the local authority, The National Lottery and through private support.
