= CinemadaMare Film Festival =

Film festival held in Italy

CinemadaMare Film Festival is the annual film festival for youth amateur short movie makers that is held in Italy.

The event was first held in 2003. During the event, groups of participants travel along several cities of Southern Italy residing in locations such as schools turned into hostels. They are holding seminars, shooting movies on the go as well as nominating previously shoot works, and participating with them in movie competitions.

The festival lasts about a month and a half ending up with awarding a set of prizes. Usually the event is attended by people from about 50 countries of the world. Some seminars are held with the participation of professional filmmakers such as Mario Monicelli, Krzysztof Zanussi, Wim Wenders, Ken Loach and others.

== See also ==
- List of film festivals in Europe
