= International Random Film Festival =

- Founded: 2010
- Film titles: International
- Festival date: Held annually
- Language: All
- Website: http://randomfilmfest.com

The International Random Film Festival is the first film festival in the world which celebrates randomness in cinema. Out of the submission 25 films are selected to compete each year. The festival is organized annually in a randomly selected location, on a random opening date. Awards are given out randomly.

== History ==
The festival was conceived one summer morning in 2009 as a breakfast idea by Hannaleena Hauru (a filmmaker from Finland) and Synes Elischka (a media artist from Austria), intended as a critique of the global short film festival network. The founders aimed to create a festival that offered all filmmakers an equal opportunity to have their work shown internationally. The festival’s underlying principle is to challenge traditional notions of competition based on quality.

The inaugural edition in 2010 was promoted solely through a Facebook group, and the festival’s official website has been active since April 2011.

== Venues ==
- 2010: 1st edition, Wiesensteig, Germany, February 2010
- 2011: 2nd edition, Bór Zapilski, Poland, July 2011
- 2012: 3rd edition, Anija, Estonia, March 2012
- 2013: 4th edition, Garpenberg, Sweden, December 2013 (opening night at Sagateatern in Hedemora)
- 2014: 5th edition, Gdynia, Poland, November 2014
- 2017: 6th edition, Helsinki, Finland, May 2017 (replacing the originally selected venue Al Hofuf, Saudi Arabia)

Every year the festival takes place on a randomly selected time, in a random venue. The location is selected by opening Wikipedia and clicking Random article repeatedly, until reaching a page representing a place with a local population. The random selection methods are documented on the website.

The date of the Festivals Opening Night is selected by using the True Random Number Generator at random.org.

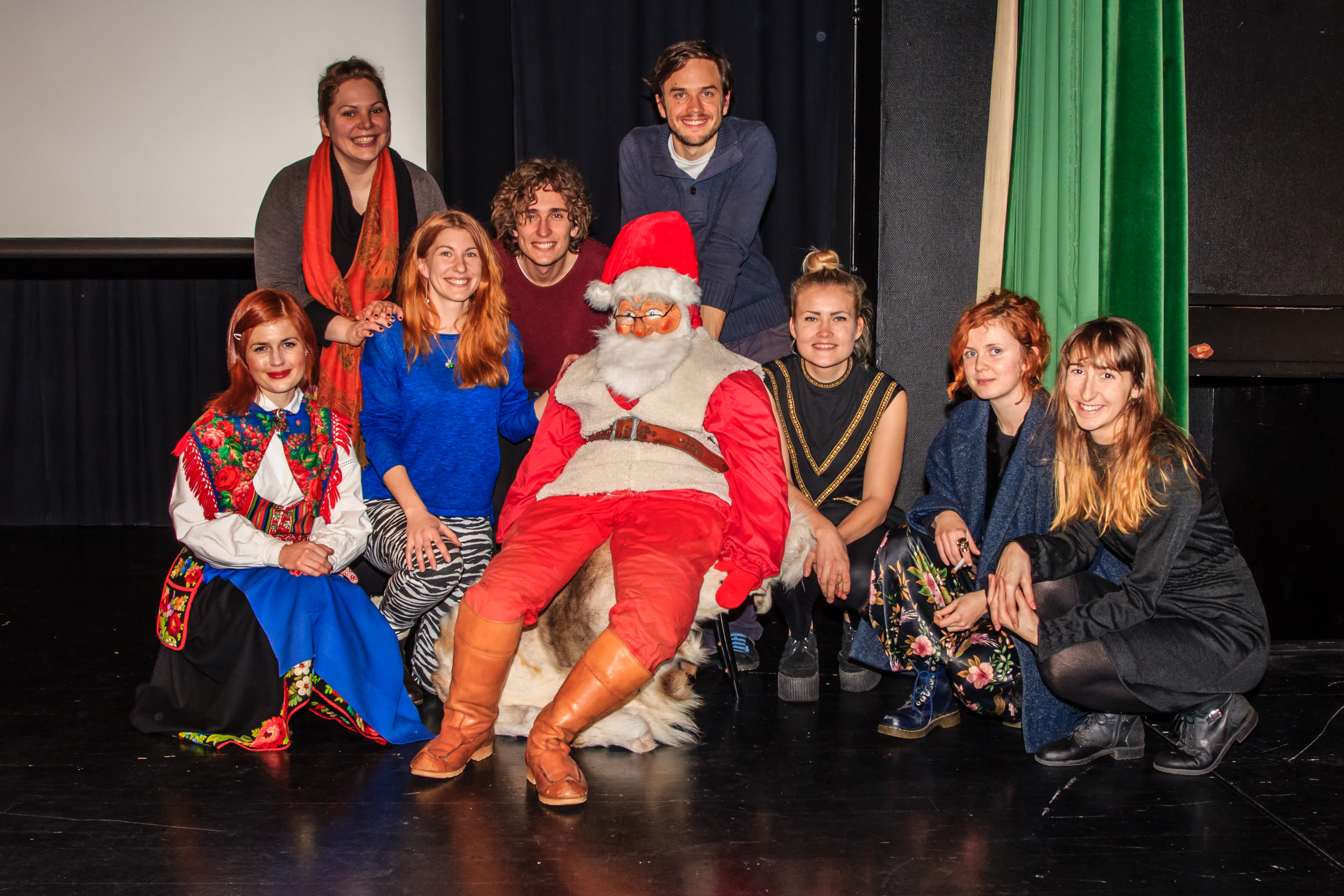
Organizers 2013

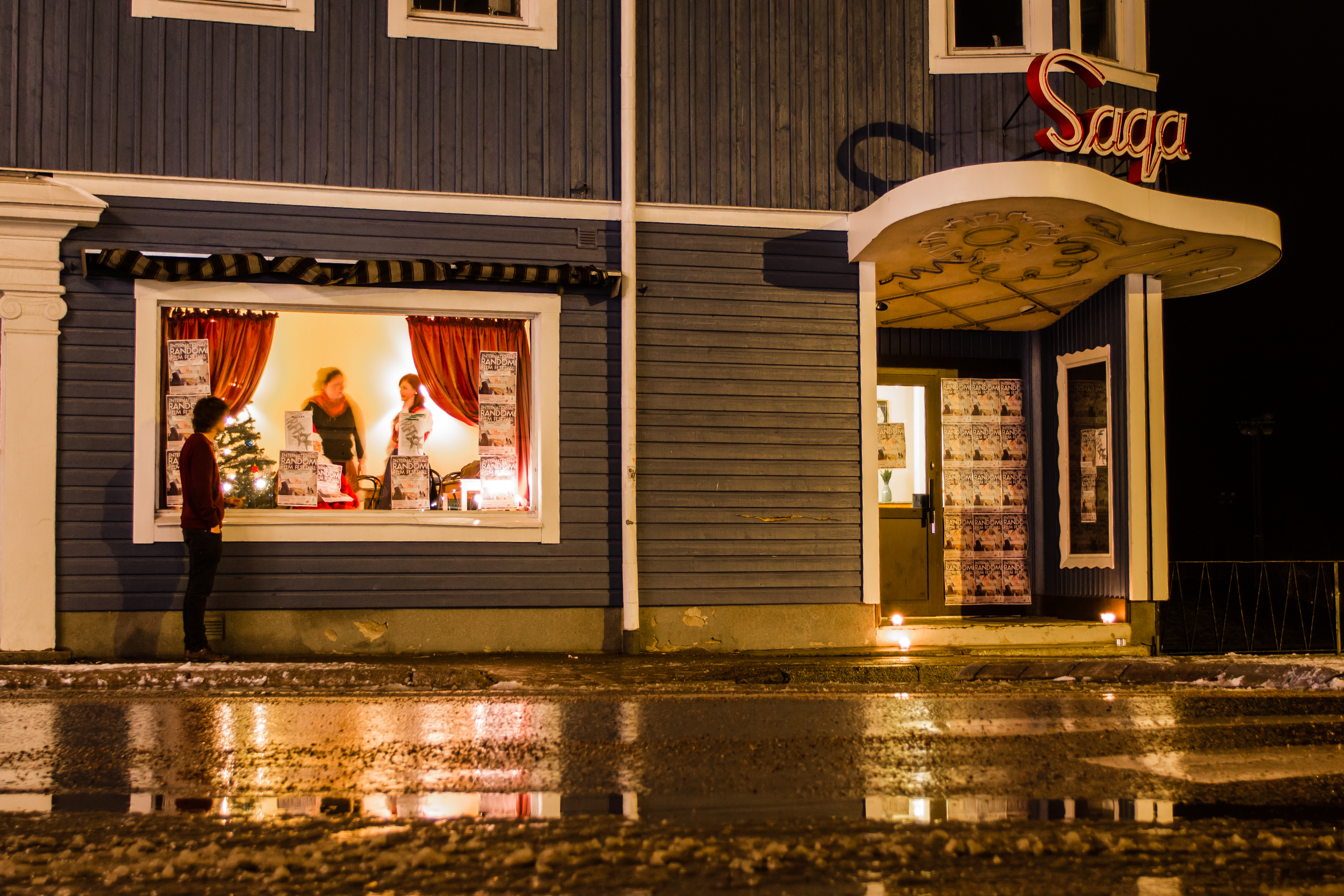
Opening night 2013

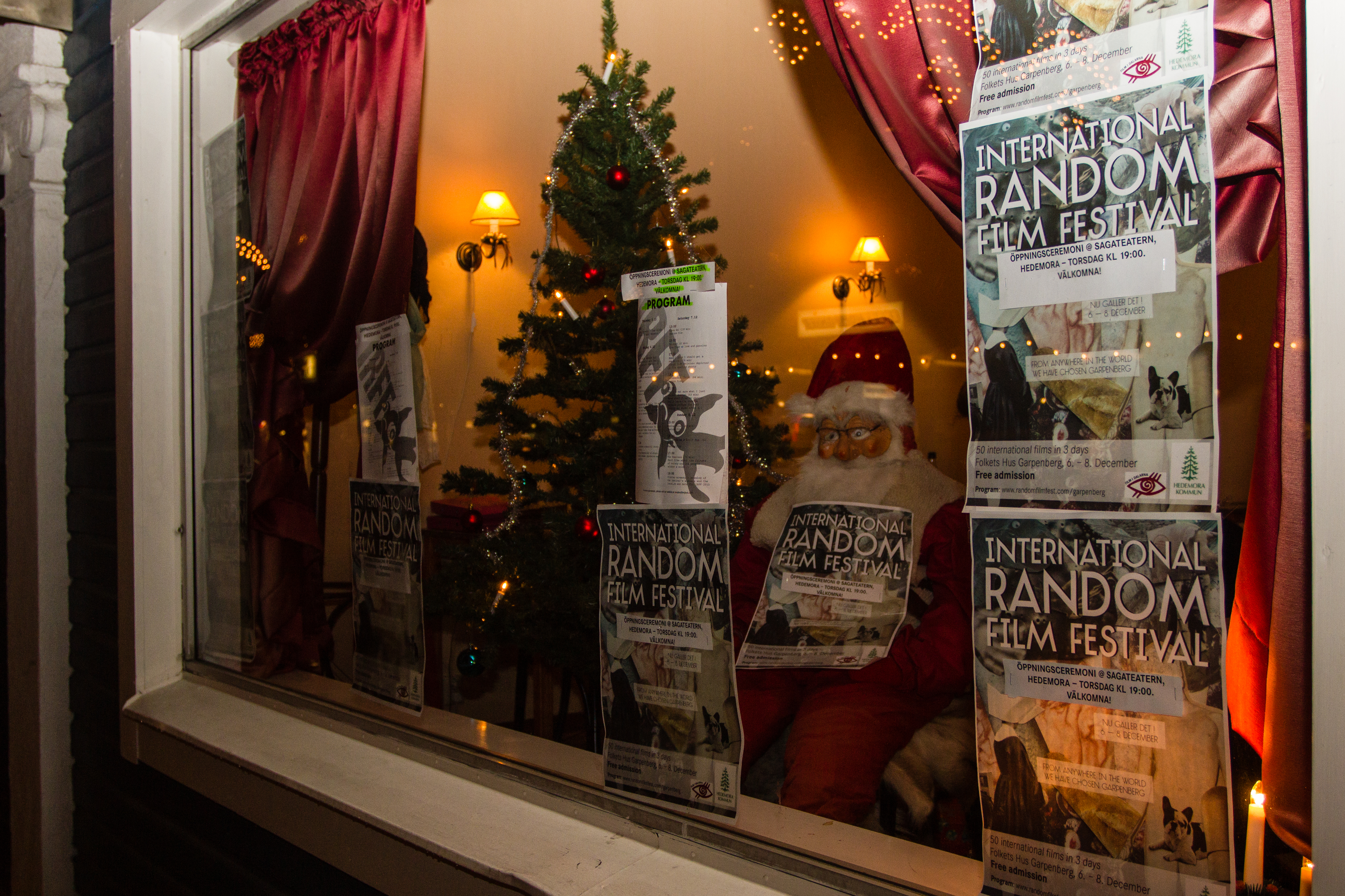
Storefront at opening night 2013
