= Garpenberg =

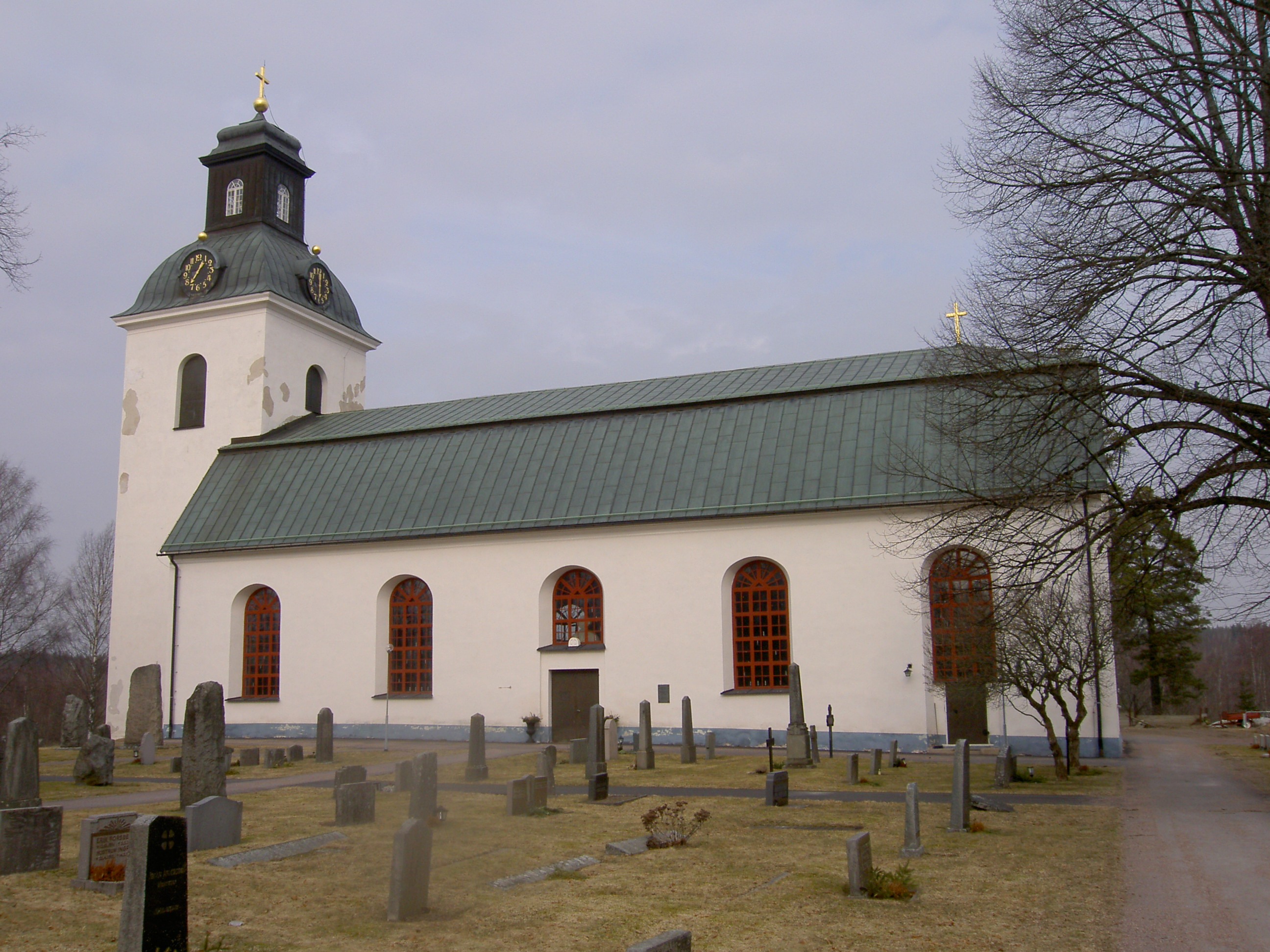
- Garpenberg Church

- Location within Dalarna Location within Sweden
- Coordinates: 60°19′N 16°12′E
- Country: Sweden
- Province: Dalarna
- County: Dalarna County
- Municipality: Hedemora Municipality

Area
  - Total: 1.53 km^{2} (0.59 sq mi)

Population (31 December 2010)
  - Total: 518
  - Density: 338/km^{2} (880/sq mi)
- Time zone: UTC+1 (CET)
  - Summer (DST): UTC+2 (CEST)

Garpenberg is a locality situated in Hedemora Municipality, Dalarna County, Sweden with 518 inhabitants in 2010.

Hedemora and Garpenberg Court District, or Hedemora och Garpenbergs tingslag, was a district of Dalarna in Sweden. The court district (tingslag) served as the basic division of the rural areas in Dalarna, except for one district that was a hundred (härad). The entire province had once been a single hundred, called Dala hundare.

Paul Palen, a sport shooter, was born here

== Mine ==
Mining in Garpenberg dates back to the 13th century, when the main mineral to be mined was iron. There are still active mining operations in Garpenberg today which produce zinc, lead and silver.

== Culture ==
The International Random Film Festival was hosted in Garpenberg in December 2013.
