= Just a Couple of Days (film) =

- Directed by: Julie Navarro
- Written by: Julie Navarro; Marc Salbert
- Produced by: Pierre Rambaldi
- Starring: Benjamin Biolay; Camille Cottin
- Cinematography: Sylvestre Dedise
- Edited by: Julia Grégory
- Music by: Arnaud Rebotini
- Production company: 31 Juin Films
- Distributed by: Charades; BAC Films
- Release date: April 23, 2024 (France)
- Running time: 93 minutes
- Country: France
- Language: French

Just a Couple of Days is 2024 French comedy-drama film is about a music critic reassigned for refugee camp when he met a woman and Afghan refugee

== Cast ==
- Camille Cottin : Mathilde
- Benjamin Biolay : Arthur
- Amrullah Safi : Daoud
- Makita Samba : Hassan
- Saadia Bentaïeb : Christine
- Loula Bartilla Besse : Emily
- Olivier Charasson : Alan
- Andranic Manet : Pablo
- Hippolyte Girardot : Laurent
- Alicia Bader : Alicia
