= Golden Beggar =

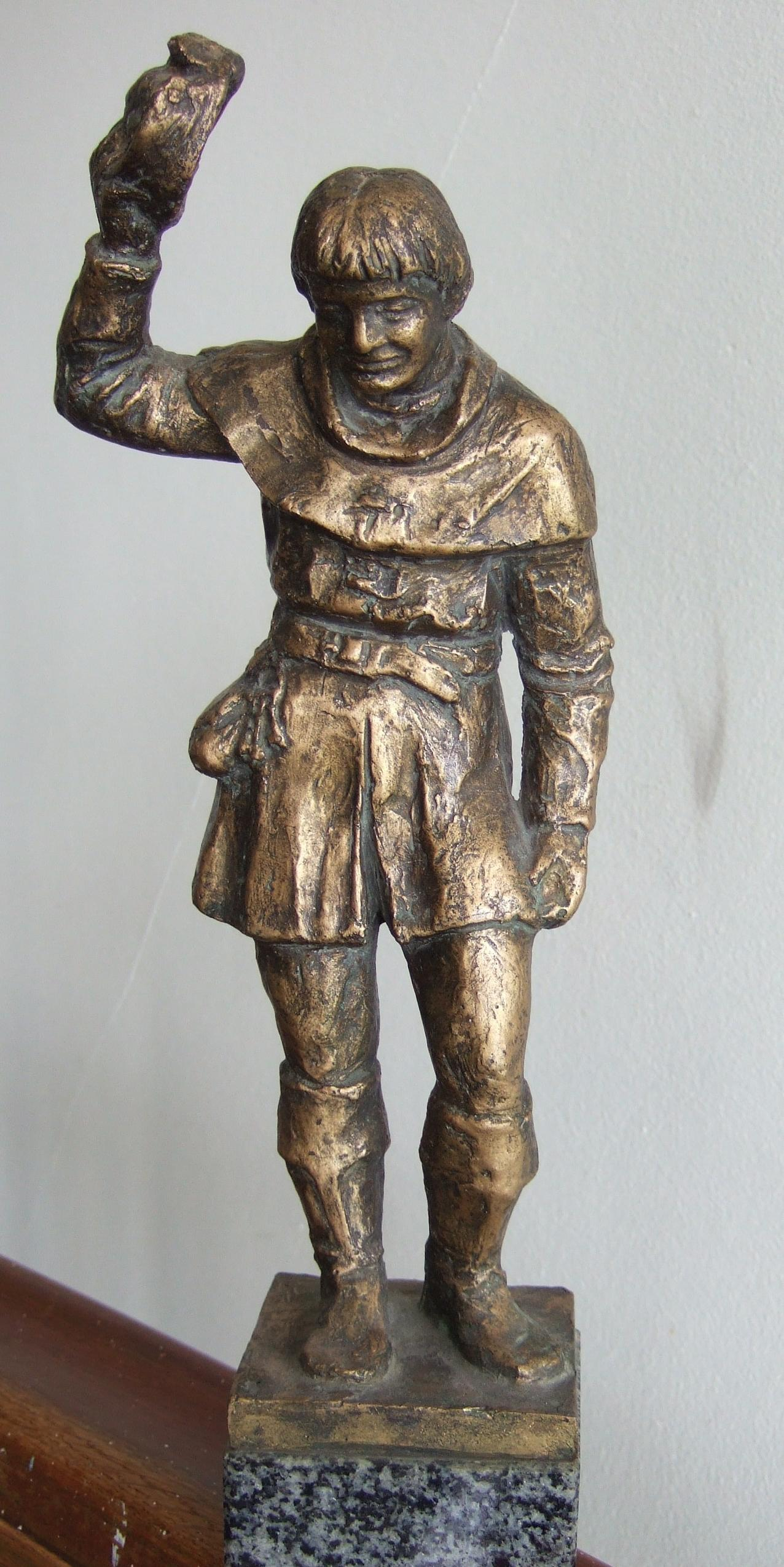
The Golden Beggar festival main price – a golden statuette of a "beggar"

The Golden Beggar (Slovak: Zlatý žobrák) is the first and the oldest international festival of local TV broadcasters, which takes place every year in June in Košice, Slovakia.

The festival was established in 1995 to celebrate, popularize and support European local TV broadcasters production.

The Golden Beggar is a huge database of local programmes and a place of high quality workshops, lectures, presentations, round tables and discussion forums. It is also a market place for programmes and a place for co-production opportunities.

The official language of the festival is English. Simultaneous interpretation with translation from and into Slovak, French, German, Spanish and Russian is available.

The festival jury is headed by journalist Ed J. Baumeister (France/U.S.).

The patron of the festival is Maroš Šefčovič, vice-president of the European Commission responsible for Inter-Institutional Relations and Administration.

== List of winners ==
- 1995 – Crime that Changed Serbia (B92, Belgrade, Yugoslavia)
- 1996 – Daniel (Sitel TV, Republic of Macedonia)
- 1997 – Mountain Boy (Alternativna TV, Banja Luka, Bosnia and Herzegovina-Republika Srpska)
- 1998 – Gone with the Wind (TV Flux, Republic of Moldova)
- 1999 – Attack (TV Niš, Niš, Yugoslavia)
- 2000 – Helmut Bistika (TV Naša, Košice, Slovakia)
- 2001 – Possibly You (TV Global, Košice, Slovakia)
- 2002 – The Rules of the Game (TV Wisla, Kraków, Poland)
- 2003 – The 21st Century (Alternativna TV, Banja Luka, Bosnia and Herzegovina-Republika Srpska)
- 2004 – The White Village (TV Čačak, Čačak, Serbia and Montenegro)
- 2005 – Muharem Music – The Eyes Of Life (TV Krug, Serbia and Montenegro)
- 2006 – Doctor Schileru (TV Etalon, Romania)
- 2007 – Mothers from the Kingdom of Shadows (OWH Studio, Chişinău, Republic of Moldova)
- 2008 – The Humoresque (TV Etalon, Romania) – An unusual portrait of a 94-year-old woman who has adhered to moral principles all her life, but she suddenly runs into a blind alley…
- 2009 – Peking 2008 (TVP Katowice, Katowice, Poland) – A film by Dagmara Drzazga is the record of a year-long observation of the people living in Polish “Peking” – the story of their joys and daily problems…
- 2009 – Resonances (Eva Verein, Poland) – A film by Alina Cyranek, Marc Recchia. The film is about a young woman, who is full of internal contradictions, and a maverick. Until her seventeenth birthday she always wanted to become a nun but things turned out differently...
- 2010 – Kill the Day (TV Belsat, Belarus) – An ordinary village in Belarusian Palessje. An old pair, Antanina and her husband Viktar, sit knee by knee in their small village hut, decorated with home–made cloths…
- 2011 – I was just a Child (Radio-Television of the Republic Srpska, Bosnia and Herzegovina) – A film by Branko Lazić is about a man who has rescued 30 children from certain death in the concentration camp Gornja Rijeka during World War II, risking his own life…
- 2012 – Bell Ringer – a film by Kate Makhova, Belarus.
