= Waterford Film Festival =

- Location: Waterford, County Waterford, Ireland
- Founded: 2007
- Festival date: November
- Language: English, others
- Website: waterfordfilmfestival.net

The Waterford Film Festival, also known as the Waterford International Film Festival, was established in 2007 in Waterford, Ireland, with the objective of "promoting local and national filmmakers and writers, but in particular independent film". It celebrated its tenth year in 2016, giving awards to 13 films.

A number of films and scripts first surfaced at the Waterford Film Festival (WFF) have gone on to screenings and award wins at other festivals, including Paradox Pictures' Lost and Found, which was screened internationally and received an 'honourable mention' at the Chicago Irish Film Festival. Peter McNamara's Narcan went on from the WFF to win 'best narrative short' at the New York Metropolitan Film Festival. Lead Peter Halpin also won the best actor award for the film at the Williamsburg Independent Film Festival.
