= Anija =

Village in Estonia

- Village
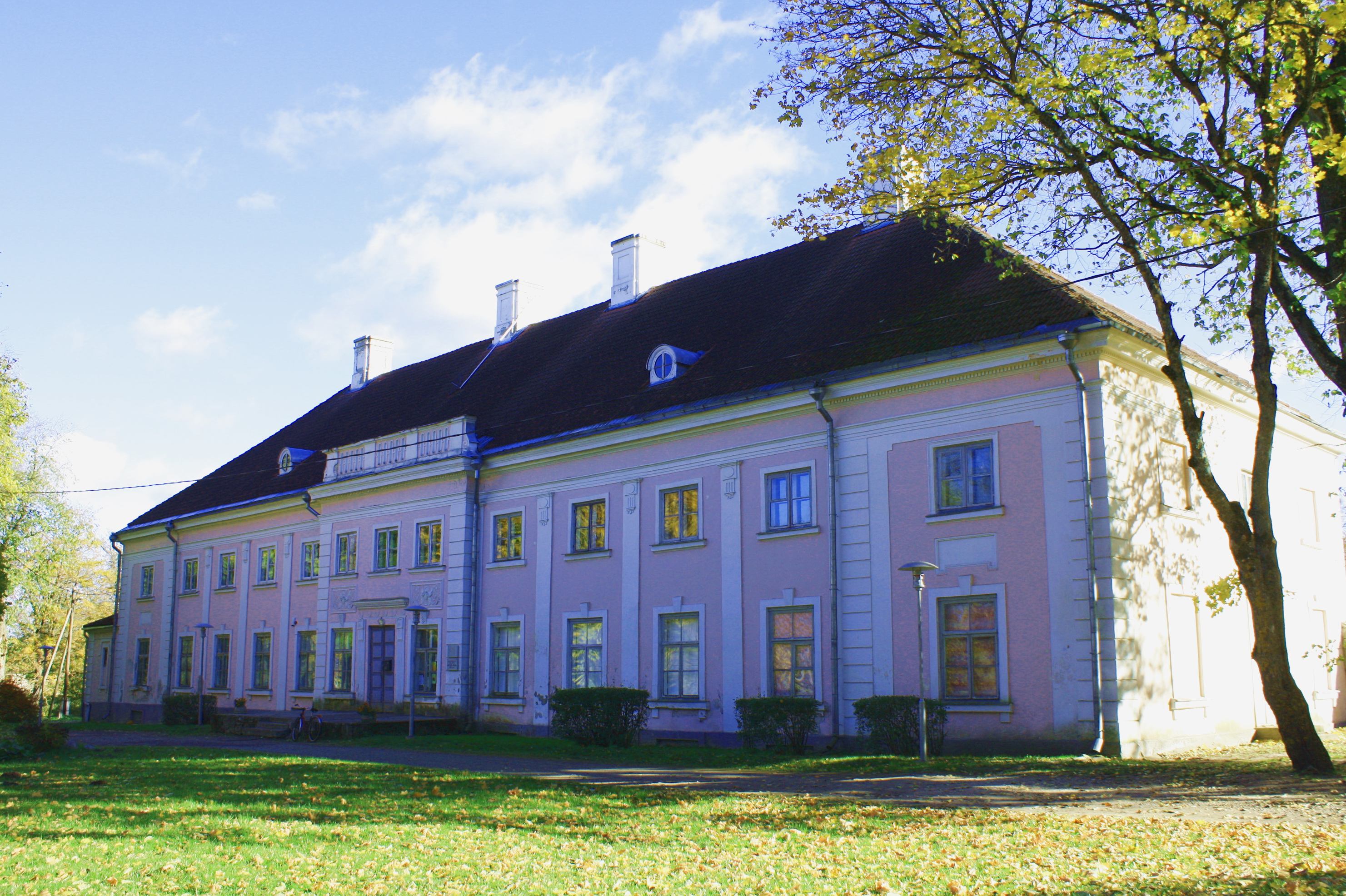
- Anija Manor

- Location in Estonia
- Coordinates: 59°23′00″N 25°18′01″E
- Country: Estonia
- County: Harju County
- Municipality: Anija Parish
- First mentioned: 1241

Population (01.01.2010)
  - Total: 128

Anija (German: Hanniecken) is a village in Anija Parish, Harju County in northern Estonia. It has a population of 128 (as of 1 January 2010).

Anija was first mentioned in 1241 as Hangægus village in the Danish Census Book.

== Anija Manor ==
A manor house has existed in Anija since at least 1482, but the present building dates from the early years of the 19th century. The manor was burned down during the uprising of 1905, but later restored more or less in its original form. The building still showcases some fine stucco decorations on both the front and back façades, as well as an ebony staircase from the early 20th century. Adjacent to the manor house the former smithy, granary, creamery and cowshed are situated. The manor house is located in a park, unique for its many foreign tree species. All in all, the manor complex is one of the best preserved in Estonia.

== Culture ==
The International Random Film Festival was hosted in Anija in March 2012.
