= CFI =

CFI may refer to:

== Organizations ==
- Campus Front of India, the student/campus wing of the Islamist organization, the Popular Front of India
- Canada Foundation for Innovation, an independent not-for-profit organization that invests in research facilities and equipment
- Carolina Film Institute, a film school
- Christian Freedom International, a religious human rights organization based in Front Royal, Virginia
- Center for Inquiry, a US nonprofit organization that works to mitigate belief in pseudoscience and the paranormal
- Colorado Fuel and Iron, a large steel conglomerate
- Community Forests International, a charity that works with sustainability in forests
- Conservative Friends of Israel, a British parliamentary group dedicated to strengthening ties between the United Kingdom and Israel
- Consolidated Film Industries, a film laboratory and film processing company
- Contract Freighters, Inc., an American truckload freight carrier based in Joplin, Missouri
- Corporate Finance Institute, an online training and education platform
- Silicon Integration Initiative (previously CAD Framework Initiative), a non-profit consortium of semiconductor, systems, EDA, and manufacturing companies
- CFI Financial Group, a global brokerage firm

== Science and technology ==
- CFI, a human gene that encodes the protein complement factor I
- Color Fidelity Index, a measure for color rendering developed by CIE which is more detailed than the Color Rendering Index (CRI) measure
- Common Flash Memory Interface, an open standard jointly developed by AMD, Intel, Sharp and Fujitsu
- Control-flow integrity, a general term for computer security techniques that prevent a wide variety of malware attacks
- Drop eligible indicator (previously Canonical Format Indicator), an element of the networking standard IEEE 802.1Q

== Other uses ==
- Continuous-flow intersection, an alternative design for an at-grade road junction
- Canal France International, a television channel of France 24
- Court of first instance, another name for a trial court
  - Court of First Instance of the High Court of Hong Kong, Hong Kong's highest trial court
  - Court of First Instance of Peru, the third-highest tier of court in the Peruvian judiciary
- ISO 10962 (also CFI), a six-letter-code used to classify and describe the structure and function of a financial instrument
- Certified flight instructor
