= Kira Bursky =

American filmmaker

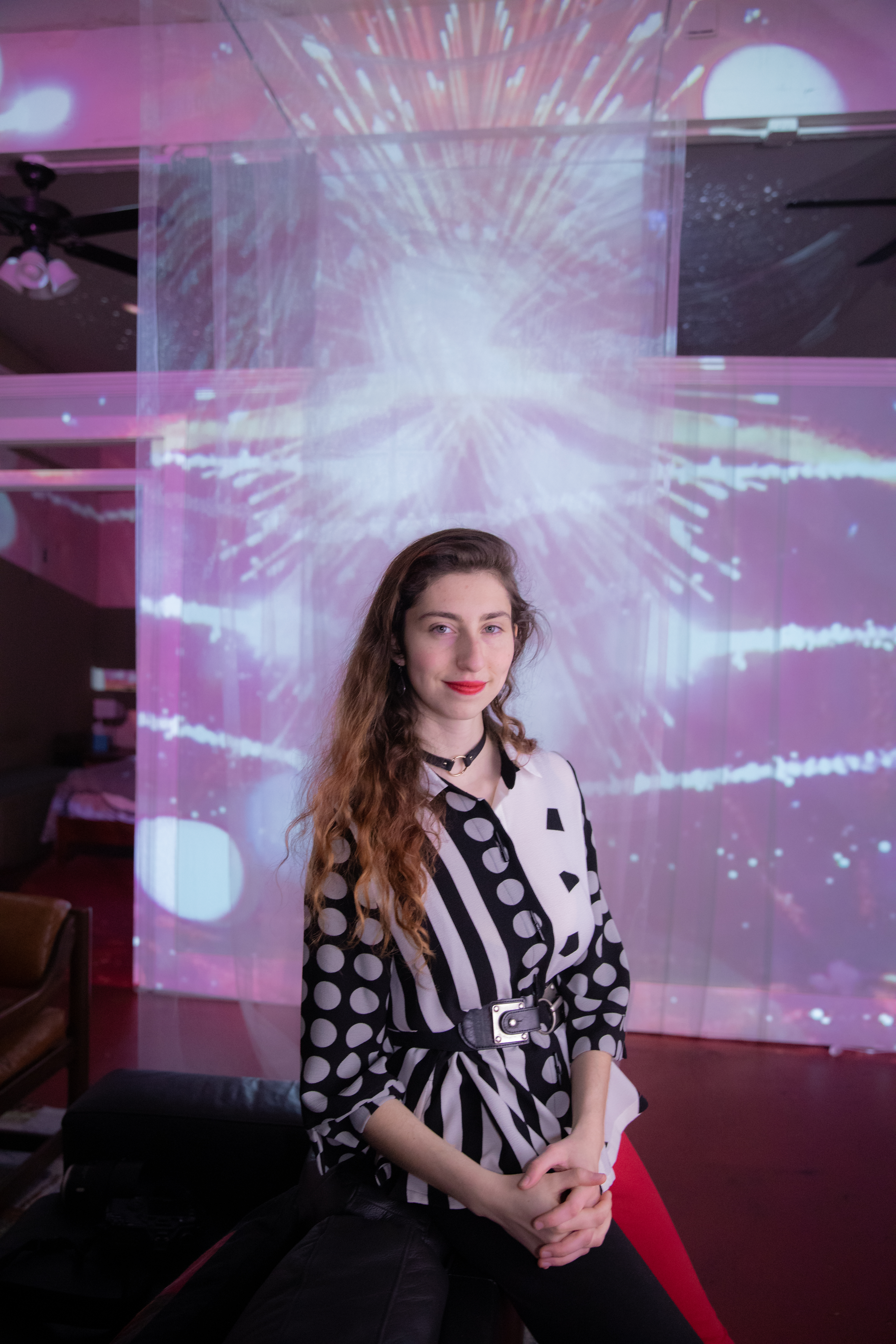
Kira Bursky at the opening night of her film installation "Considerations of Infinity."

Kira Bursky is a filmmaker, screenwriter, and artist currently based out of Asheville, NC.

All Around Artsy was founded in 2009 by Kira Bursky, a vagabonding storyteller with an insatiable hunger for magic. She has produced over 60 films and music videos that have screened at festivals around the world from Los Angeles to Berlin to Beijing. In 2014 Kira was recognized as National YoungArts Finalist and was a finalist in the White House Student Film Festival where she had the honor of screening her work in the White House. In 2015 Kira was selected as the Best Emerging Female Filmmaker at the National Film Festival for Talented Youth (NFFTY). In 2016 she was featured in Seventeen Magazine as the April issue's Power Girl and received the Emerging Artist to Watch grant through Le Couvent artist residency in France. Kira and her creations have been featured through NPR, Out Magazine, Pride and No Film School to name a few. Her YouTube channel has over 34,000+ subscribers and 16 million+ views.

"Bursky is just 23 years old, but the Asheville filmmaker is already on a trajectory to becoming one of America’s most incisive and distinctive auteurs." – Matt Peiken, Arts Producer BPR + NPR

== Background ==
Kira Bursky, originally from Upper Nyack, NY, attended Asheville High School's School of Inquiry and Life Sciences program for one year and Evergreen Community Charter School for middle school. She also attended the Carolina Film Institute for one year at age 13.

She later attended high school at the Interlochen Arts Academy in Michigan as a Motion Picture Arts major, graduating in 2014. She worked at documentary filmmaker Morgan Spurlock's New York-based film production company, Warrior Poets, as a post-production intern.

== Awards ==
Her works have been featured and awarded prizes at over 100 domestic and international film festivals including the All-American High School Film Festival, the Chicago International Children's Film Festival, the Colchester International Film Festival, Guam International Film Festival, the White House Student Film Festival, Princeton Student Film Festival, and the Cannes Film Festival.

Year	Result	Festival	Award	Work
2014	Winner	Mosaic Film Festival	Best Overall	Girly
2014	Winner	Lovett School High School Film Fest	Best U.S Narrative	Girly
2015	Winner	Made-in-Michigan Film Festival	Best Academic Film	Girly
2014	Winner	Lovett School High School Film Fest	Best U.S. Animation	What Are You?
2014	Winner	Mosaic Film Festival	Best Overall	We're Okay
2014	Winner	All American High School Film Festival	Best Overall Film	We're Okay
2015	Winner	National Film Festival For Talented Youth	Best Emerging Female Filmmaker	We're Okay
2014	Winner	Highway 61	Best Student - 2nd Place	We're Okay
2016	Winner	Horror Hour	Best Horror High School Short Film	We're Okay
2016	Winner	Ramūno Ateljė Independent International Film Awards	Best Teenager Film	Really Looking
2015	Winner	24 Hour Film Racing	Best Editing & Best Sound Design	It's Just You
2016	Winner	George Lindsey UNA Film Festival	Best Youth Filmmaker	Tree Hugger
2015	Winner	Laguna Film Festival	Jury Award for Best Youth Film + Audience Award for Best Youth Film	Tree Hugger
2016	Winner	Festival Internacional de Cine y Audiovisual Infantil y Juvenil	Best Film in +13 Audio Visual	Tree Hugger
2015	Winner	StarLite Film Festival	Best Domestic Student Short	Demons in Disguise
2016	Winner	Little Elephant	Best Maxi 2	Demons in Disguise
2014	Winner	White House Student Film Festival	Finalist	Hello From Malaysia
2014	Winner	MY HERO International Film Festival	Best High School Narrative - 2nd Place	Hello From Malaysia
2015	Winner	Lovett School High School Film Fest	Best U.S. Animation	Warm Rush
2014	Winner	Josiah Media Festival	Best Experimental - 2nd Place	Warm Rush
2015	Winner	Brighton Youth Film Festival	Best International Short Film	Hattie
2015	Winner	Seattle Horror 48 Hour Film Project	Best Film	Adulthood
2016	Winner	Huntsville 48 Hour Film Project	Best Film	Footplant
2017	Winner	Music Video Asheville	Best Music Video + Best Editing	Dancing Children
2017	Winner	FilmSPARK	Best Kids and Family Film	Dancing Children
2017	Winner	Music Video Asheville	Best Visual Design	We Are the People
2017	Winner	100 Words Film Festival	Best Scripted Film	Fake Emma
2017	Winner	North Carolina Family Film Festival 2017	Best NC Short	To and From
2017	Winner	Grenada Afterglow Film Festival	Best AfterTHOUGHT	To and From
2018	Winner	Asheville 48 Hour Film Project	Best Film	She Once Was Distant
2018	Winner	New Orleans 48 Hour Film Project	Best Film Runner Up	Demon Pills
2018	Winner	Music Video Asheville	Best Visual Design	You Help Me Fall Asleep
2017	Winner	All-American High School Film Festival	Best College Doc	Close to the Window
2018	Winner	Planet Why's YUP Selected	Audience Choice Award	Close to the Window
2018	Winner	FilmPlaya	Golden Pocket Pistol	Period.
2018	Winner	Berlin Liberi Film Festival	Best in Fest	Period.
2019	Winner	Jim Thorpe Independent Film Festival	Best Experimental Film	Period.
2019	Winner	Music Video Asheville	Best Music Video + Best Editing	Carolina Stomp

== Featured works ==
- Wild Flowers (2016) - 10 million+ views on YouTube
- Tree Hugger (2015) - 4 million+ views on YouTube
- Adulthood (2015) - 1 million+ views on YouTube
- Period. (2019)
- We're Okay (2014)
- Closet Made of Sheets (2017)
- Demon Pills (2017)
- To and From (2016)
- Really Looking (2016)
- She Once Was Distant (2018)
- Fake Emma (2018)
- Girly (2013)
- Foreshadow (2019)
