= Academia Film Olomouc =

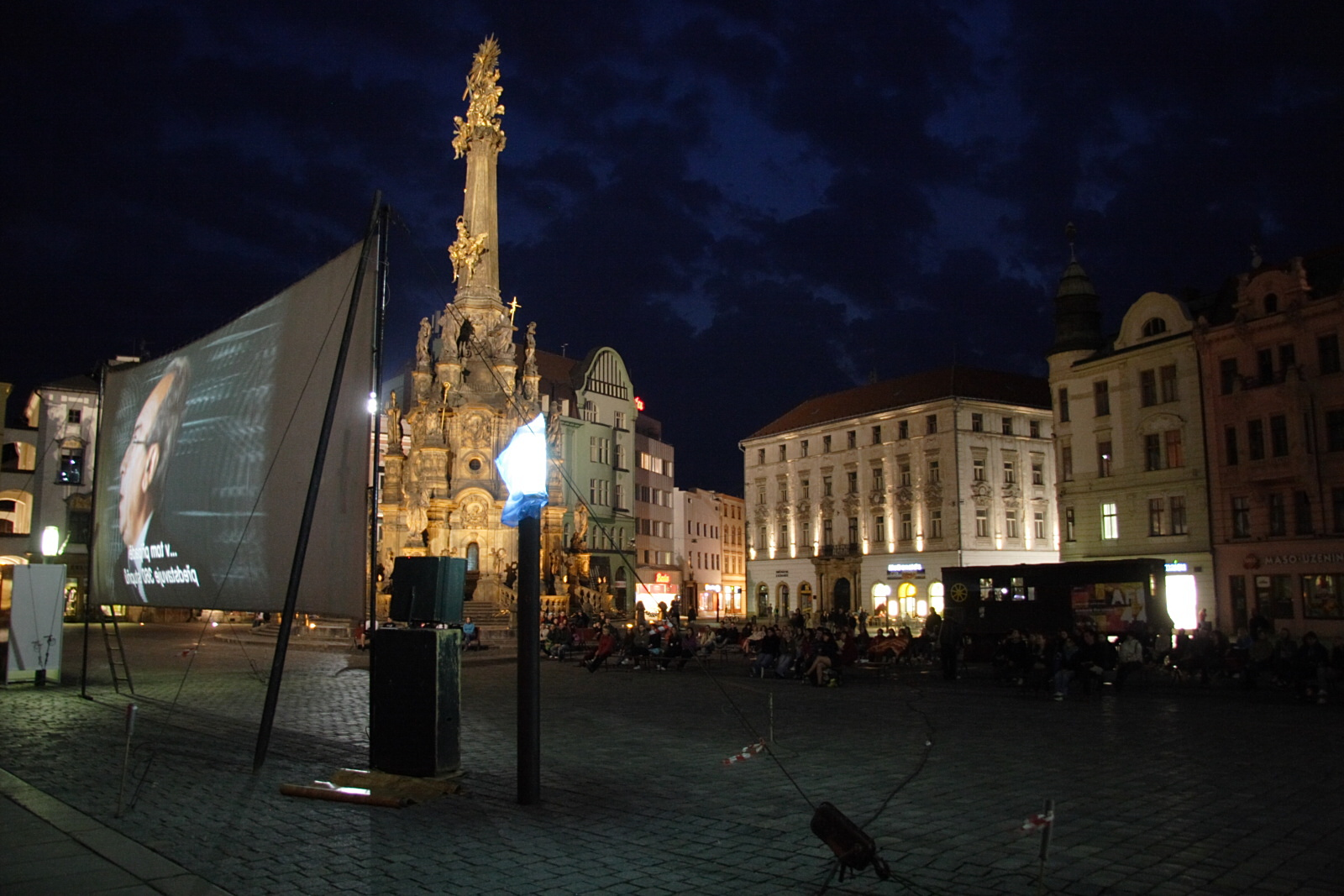
Academia Film Olomouc in 2009

Academia Film Olomouc (AFO) is an international science documentary film festival in Olomouc, Czech Republic, held each April under the patronage of Palacký University. The focus of the festival is science and educational films from the fields of humanities, natural science and social science, as well as current scientific, artistic and technological advances. The festival features TV productions (BBC, Discovery, PBS), podcasts, YouTube channels, and on-demand broadcast, with the aim of science popularization. A variety of film specialists and scientists are invited to discuss current topics with audiences after film screenings, and at special lectures or workshops. The audience mostly consists of visitors with an interest in audio-visual production or science topics, university students, and high school students. The program also focuses on children with a special program block offering film screenings, workshops, and games.

AFO arranges an ongoing accompanying program for the general public. It consists of exhibitions, interventions and events in public spaces, as well as AFO Echoes, which screens films from the festival in cinemas.

== History ==
=== Origin and early years ===
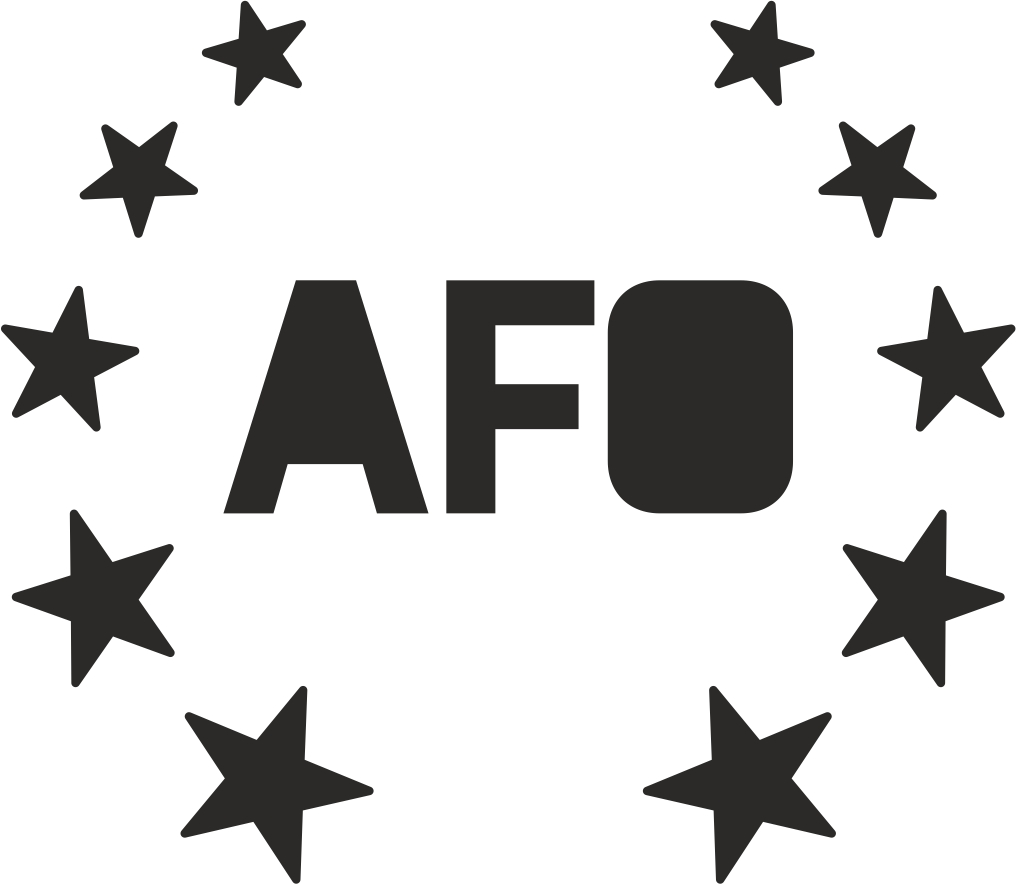
Academia Film Olomouc logo

Academia Film Olomouc was established in 1966 by the Czechoslovak Academy of Sciences, Short Film Prague and Palacký University, inspired by a festival of didactic films in Padua, Italy, also held within the university campus. Short Film Prague, the main promoter of the festival from its beginning, had been producing educational films since the 1950s, by film-makers including Jiří Lehovec, Jan Calábek and Bohumil Vošáhlík. These films presented current scientific discoveries and innovations so as to be comprehensible to students and schoolchildren, as well as scientists, and gained an international reputation at the time. In addition, the 1950s and 1960s saw Czechoslovak State Film create a separate department dealing with similar topics.

The university and the film industry collaborated to introduce the general public to up-to-date scientific ideas. The festival in Padua became a model for staff at the Czechoslovak Academy of Sciences, who turned to Palacký University, known for an active programme of cultural events in the 1960s. The university professor Jiří Stýskal sponsored the first screenings of science documentary films in Olomouc with his colleagues Eduard Petrů, Alena Štěrbová and Miroslav Tomšů in 1966. Twelve months later, after its positive reception, the festival was given the name Academia Film.

Throughout the 1960s and 1970s, the festival grew in size and popularity. Czechoslovak Television participated in the festival, contributing educational films and shows to the festival program. Interest in AFO increased during the 1980s and the number of competition films grew. What started as a small university event became a festival that drew the attention of the wider public. AFO reacted to the growth of the video phenomenon in 1986 by including in its program one of the first video projections in Czechoslovakia. The festival expanded its program and gave space to video projection documenting scientific and technical procedures. The video programs got their own program block called Videoforum.

=== Post-Communism ===
In the 1990s, AFO became an international festival, but experienced a serious threat from the termination of state funding. While still receiving funding from the Ministry of Education, Youth and Sports, Czech Academy of Sciences, and the Ministry of Culture, the festival was increasingly forced to rely on private sponsors. In 1999 Jan Schneider became the director of AFO, replacing Jindřich Schulz, the former vice-chancellor of Palacký University.

In 2001, the festival moved part of its operations to the Regional Museum, where a video forum, media forum and film bar were set up, with Schneider telling MF Dnes newspaper that the move was "a way of bringing the event closer to the audience". The festival was renamed as the International Festival of Documentary Films and Multimedia Educational Programs. In 2007, responsibility for organizing the festival was taken on by the Department of Theatre, Film and Media Studies of Palacký University, with Petr Bilík as the director, and they started working with JSAF, a non-governmental organization (NGO) which organizes the Jihlava International Documentary Film Festival. The festival changed its name to the International Festival of Science Documentary Films, with the motto "Watch and Know" defining the festival as an educational and science documentary film festival. Since then, AFO has been devoting more space to educational programs by organizations like the BBC and the Discovery Channel. In 2013, festival statutes were published defining the goals and purpose of the festival as well as its organizational structure.

== Program ==
=== Festival programming ===
The Programming team, consisting mostly of members of Palacký University, oversees the festival program. The program sections are connected to an umbrella topic which changes every year. The festival's focus is non-fiction documentaries related to scientific and socio-scientific topics, scientists, research results, ethical questions related to the boundaries of human knowledge, and access to education.

The festival program has four main areas: competition, thematic section, Industry 4Science for the professional public, and the accompanying program of concerts, exhibitions, and performances. The festival competition is based around films pre-selected by the programming team, who review current productions in the science documentary field and approach relevant production groups such as the World Congress of Science and Factual Producers. In 2017 there were about 4000 films submitted for the competition, with about 40 of them selected for their respective competition categories. Expert juries made up of Czech and international authors, producers, scientists and publicists, choose the winners of the competition categories.

The stated aims of AFO are:

- To present science, research and technology to the general public as fascinating and crucial fields of human activity and inherent part of our culture and society.
- To approach the broad public with current as well as future burning issues of our civilization, planet and space.
- To connect the academic sphere and scientific institutions with professionals from television and film industry and other cultural institutions.
- To support creation of new educational films, TV broadcasts and other multimedia formats.
- To encourage and form active and critical thinking audiences.

=== Festival awards ===
The festival competition is divided into several categories. Thousands of films from all around the world are submitted every year. The dramaturgy team makes a shortlist of films to be presented to the juries and the festival audience.

- AFO Statutory Awards
  - The RCPTM award for the Best International Science Documentary film - awarded by a panel of Czech and international experts
  - The innogy award for the Best Czech Science Documentary Film - awarded by a panel of Czech and international experts
  - Award for the Best Short Science Documentary Film - awarded by a panel of Czech and international experts
  - Award for contribution to the popularization of science (individual) - granted by the AFO dramaturgy team
  - Award for contribution to the popularization of science (institution) - granted by the AFO dramaturgy team
- AFO Non-Statutory Awards
  - Audience Award, decided by a vote of the festival audience and chosen from all films across festival competition categories.
  - The Palacký University Student Jury Award – student representatives of each faculty choose the best film from all competition categories.

=== Thematic sections ===
Besides the festival competitions, the main content of the festival program is presented through thematic sections, each of which are related to the annual umbrella topic of that year's festival. Every dramaturge curates one of the thematic sections for which they select films, TV shows, lectures, workshops, guests and an accompanying program.

AFO Junior, targeting children and youth, is one of the regular thematic sections, run in cooperation with the Na Cucky Theatre, Fort Science and ČT Déčko TV channel. It includes screenings, thematic workshops, virtual reality, basic filmmaking techniques, and animation workshops.

=== Accompanying program ===
The festival organizers also run an accompanying program, which runs during the festival as well as the rest of the year, consisting of exhibitions, workshops, screenings, and site-specific events. Over the years, the accompanying program has features exhibits such as a huge ice cube in the festival graphic design on Horní náměstí, virtual reality shows in Auditorium Maximum, AFO graffiti and street art around Olomouc, outdoor screenings at the square, or 3D printer demonstrations. Throughout the year, AFO Kino film screenings are organized in cooperation with Kino Metropol.

The AFO Echoes program puts on showings of films from the main festival in other cities and towns, in venues such as observatories, schools, cafés, and cinemas.

The festival also has a music program, presenting Czech and foreign musicians who connect music and science.

=== 4Science ===
The 4Science program section focuses primarily on professional networking in the field of education and science documentary films, connecting scientists, filmmakers and audio-visual industry representatives. This section consists of Camp 4Science and Industry 4Science.

Camp 4Science is a six-day educational workshop for beginner filmmakers and new film projects which focus on science popularization through science and non-fiction documentary films. The workshop program covers technical procedures, creation of narratives in documentary films, special approaches to documentary production and financing.

Industry 4Science brings together audio-visual industry representatives with science experts, who then share their knowledge of technical innovations, transformation of audiences and their habits, or future topics to be covered. The aim of this meeting is to establish new cooperation among the participating TV channel productions and production groups.

== Festival guests ==
The festival regularly features high-profile guests from the fields of science, cinematography and television production. Recent guests have included: Albert Barillé, the French creator of the series Once Upon a Time... (2007); British BBC documentary maker Nigel Marven (2008); Jeff Lieberman, the American host of the Discovery Channel show Time Warp (2009); Andrew Holtz, author of the book The Medical Science of House, M.D.; the undersea filmmaker Steve Lichtag; and the British filmmaker and biologist David Barlow, who films the inside of human bodies. In 2013 Richard Saunders was invited to be a member of the "World Competition Jury" for the 48th festival. He also gave a lecture on the claims of water divining as part of the "Pseudoscience" block and a lecture and workshops on origami as part of "The Beauty of Numbers" block.

== See also ==
- List of film festivals in the Czech Republic
