= Fresh Film Festival =

Coordinates: 50°4′56.13″N 14°26′56.12″E

Fresh Film Fest
- Location: Prague, Czech Republic (2010–2014); Karlovy Vary, Czech Republic (2004–2009)
- Established: 2004
- Founded by: Martin Pošta, and co-founders from FAMU
- Most recent: 2014
- No. of films: 11
- Language: Multiple
- Website: www.freshfilmfest.net (archived)

The Fresh Film Fest (also known as the Fresh Film Fest International Film Festival) was an annual student film festival held in the Czech Republic for 11 editions between 2004 and 2014. Founded as a successor to the long-running CILECT festival in Karlovy Vary, Fresh Film Fest presented screenings, workshops, and competition programmes featuring student and emerging filmmakers from across the world. The festival ceased operations in 2015.

== Background and origins ==
The International Association of Film and Television Schools (CILECT) had previously organised a festival for student films in Karlovy Vary, initially as an independent event and subsequently as a parallel event within the Karlovy Vary International Film Festival (KVIFF). Over the years, CILECT attracted filmmakers who would go on to pursue significant careers, including Jan Svěrák and Emir Kusturica.

== History ==
Fresh Film Fest was founded in 2004 by Martin Pošta and three fellow students from the Film and TV School of The Academy of Performing Arts in Prague (FAMU). The festival was conceived as a competitive showcase for student cinema from the Czech Republic and abroad, providing a platform that had been absent since the end of the CILECT screenings in Karlovy Vary. The organising team was composed primarily of students. From its first edition, the event presented public screenings of over 250 films per year, drawn from a range of countries and genres.

For its first six editions from 2004 to 2009, Fresh Film Fest was held in Karlovy Vary. In 2010, the seventh edition of the festival relocated from Karlovy Vary to Prague, with the aim of increasing the festival's capacity and reach.

The Prague years saw the festival continue its annual programme, with each edition organised around a distinct thematic focus. The eleventh and final edition, held in 2014, centred on the theme of young directors and the new generation of emerging filmmakers. In May 2015, the organisers announced the cancellation of the festival's 12th edition, citing a lack of funding.

== Festival format ==
Each edition of Fresh Film Fest was held in August, typically running over several days. The programme featured screenings of over 250 student and debut films in a typical year, spanning documentary, fiction, animation, and experimental formats. Screenings were free or low-cost and open to the general public. The organising team was composed predominantly of FAMU students and recent graduates. Alongside screenings, the programme included filmmaker discussions, workshops, and themed retrospectives.

Each edition was built around a particular theme; the 2010 theme was "Heroes", while the 2014 edition focused on young directors.

== See also ==
- List of film festivals in the Czech Republic
