= Festival of fantasy =

Festival of fantasy may refer to:

- Festival fantazie, a science fiction and fantasy convention held in the Czech Republic
- Festival of Fantasy Parade, the current daytime parade at the Magic Kingdom at the Walt Disney World Resort
