= Anifest =

Defunct international film festival of Czech Republic

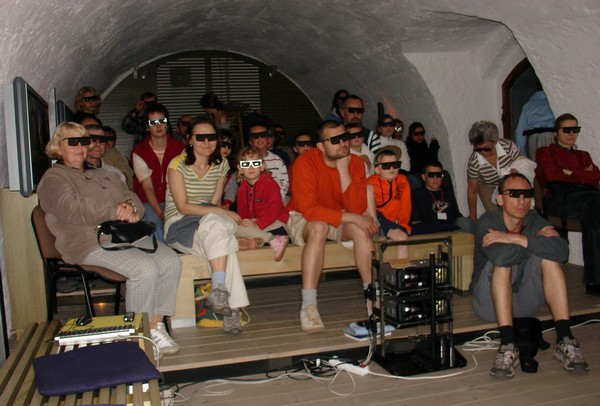
3D movie screening at the 2007 festival in Třeboň

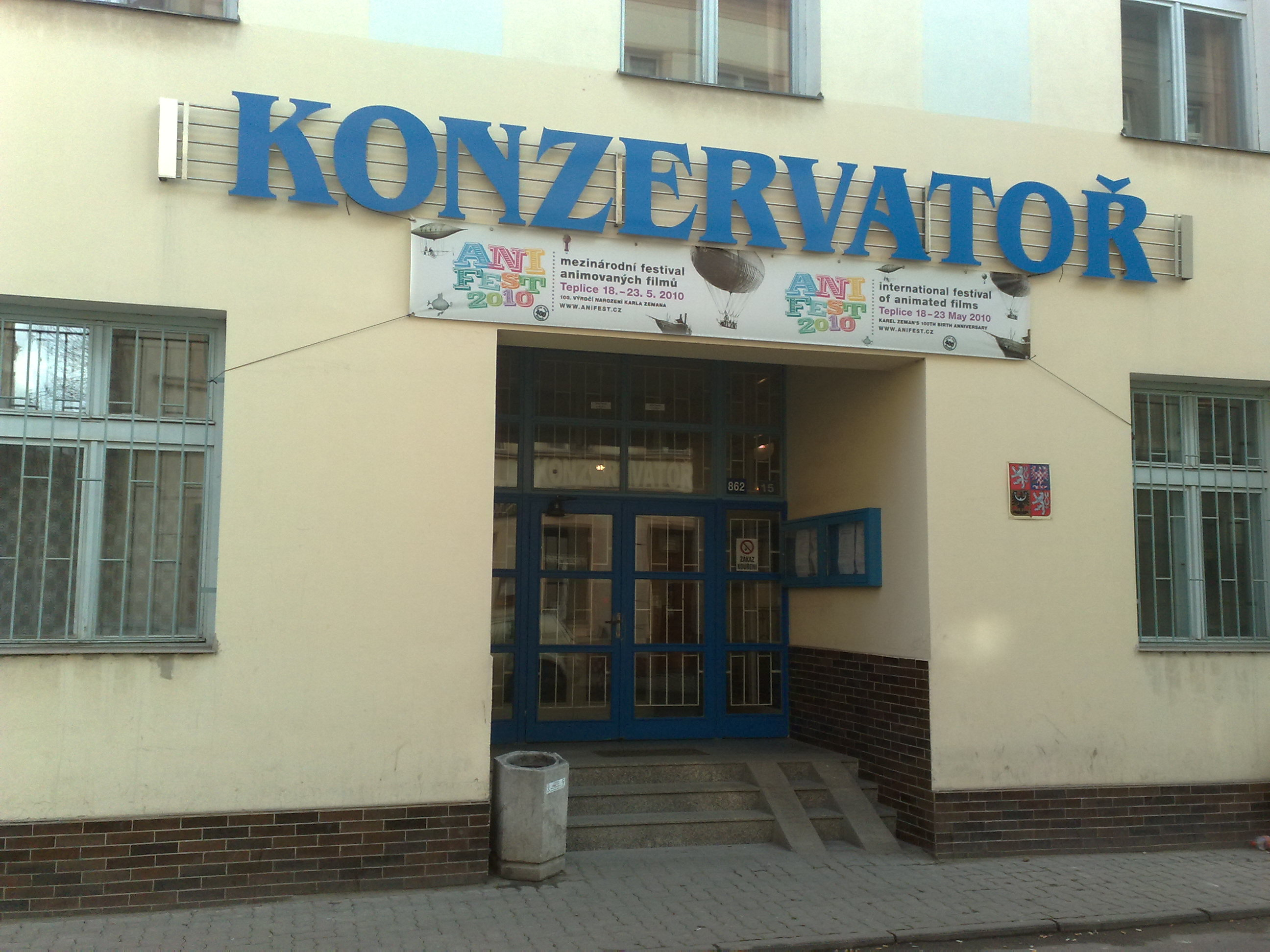
Konzervatoř Teplice - Anifest 2010

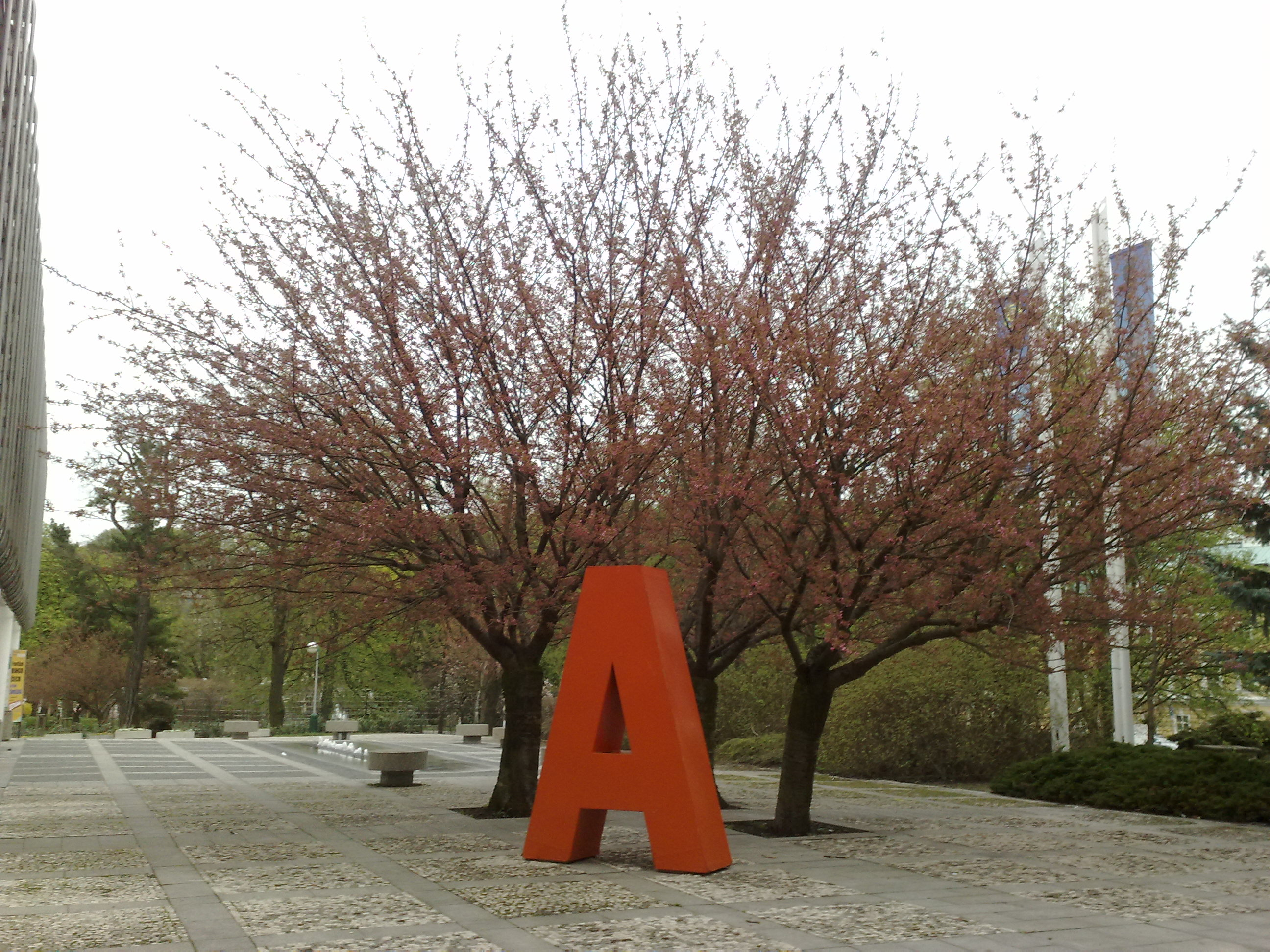
Teplice - Anifest 2013

The International Festival of Animated Films AniFest was an international festival of animated films that was annually held in the Czech Republic from the years 2002 to 2013, when Anifest was merged with Anifilm. In the festival's prime, the event attracted more than twenty-thousand guests per year.

The festival was a specialized competition of animated productions for film professionals, artists and animation lovers. In addition to the competitive and non-competitive film events, the festival included various theatre performances, exhibitions, concerts and discussions, parties and other cultural and social events.

In 2010, Anifest was held in the North Bohemian city of Teplice. It marked the 100th birthday of film director Karel Zeman. The AniFest 2010 juries consisted of personalities from the world of animation, including film directors, film artists, film historians, and university professors from around the world.

In 2013, Anifest was merged with Anifilm, which is still currently held today in the Czech Republic.

== See also ==
- Anifilm
- List of film festivals in the Czech Republic
