= Cinema Mundi International Film Festival =

Film festival in the Czech Republic

- Location: Brno, Czech Republic
- Founded: 2010
- Disestablished: 2016

The Cinema Mundi International Film Festival was a film festival, held annually at the end of February, or beginning of March in Brno, Czech Republic, between 2010 and 2016.

== History ==
The first Cinema Mundi International Film Festival took place in late February, early March 2010 in Brno, Czech Republic. The inspiration for the festival came from the tradition of Brno Exhibition Centre, which was established in 1928 and since then has been attracting international exhibitors to Brno. Josef Čadík, a film fan who has been operating mobile open-air cinemas in the Czech Republic and Central Europe since 1991, established the festival in the desire to create in Brno a similar platform for the world of film. He is the current director of the festival. The main partner of the festival is the South Moravian Region whose administrative body is seated in Brno.

== Program ==
In addition to screening the most recent selection of films made in Europe and the US, the festival aims at screening films representing the contemporary national cinemas of the countries of Central and South America, Africa and Asia. When selecting films from these countries in particular, the festival commission pays their special attention to the films that have been submitted to the Academy of Motion Picture Arts and Sciences in the United States (Oscars) for consideration in the category of Best Foreign Language Film. These films then often become a part of the main competitive section of the Cinema Mundi International Film Festival program. Additional sections of the festival include the latest Czech-language feature films and feature films that represent contemporary film art from three selected countries or a particular region.

== Festival jury and winners ==
Since the second year of the festival in 2011, the Student Jury selects the best films. The Jury is formed by students of Masaryk University, the second largest university in the Czech Republic, whose students participate in the realization and organization of the festival to a great extent. Four Best Films have been chosen and six Special Awards have been bestowed by the Student Jury in the past four years:

Best Film
Year	Film title	Director	Country of origin
2014	Halima's Path	Arsen Anton Ostojić	Croatia
2013	Blood of My Blood	João Canijo	Portugal
2012	As If I'm Not There	Juanita Wilson	Ireland
2011	Of Gods and Men	Xavier Beauvois	France

Special Award
Year	Film title	Director	Country of origin
2014	The Missing Picture	Rithy Panh	Cambodia
2013	Lore	Cate Shortland	Australia
2012	Punk's Not Dead	Vladimir Blazevski	Macedonia
2012	Elite Squad: The Enemy Within	José Padilha	Brazil
2011	Life, Above All (2010)	Oliver Schmitz	South Africa
2011	East, West, East: The Final Sprint	Gjergj Xhuvani	Albania

== Festival guests ==
Since its inauguration in 2010, the Cinema Mundi International Film Festival has welcomed several accomplished guests from the world of film, including Goran Marković, director, Serbia; Srđan Karanović, director, Serbia; Lordan Zafranović, director, Croatia; İsmail Güneş, director, Turkey; Yesim Ceren Bozoglu, actress, Turkey; Iveta Grófová, director, Slovakia; João Canijo, director, Portugal; Vladimír Blazevski, director, Macedonia; Juanita Wilson, director, Ireland; Sulev Keedus, director, Estonia; Karel Roden, actor, Czech Republic; Martin Šulík, director, Slovakia; Jiří Menzel, director, Czech Republic; Hilda Hidalgo, director, Costa Rica; Jaroslav Vojtek, director, Slovakia; Anjorka Strechel, actress, Germany; Jaroslav Dušek, actor, Czech Republic; Paresh Mokashi, director, India; Miguel Littín, director, Chile; Justin Molotnikov, director, Scotland; Stephen McCole, actor, Scotland and others.

== See also ==
- List of film festivals in the Czech Republic
