= Student film =

Films made by students

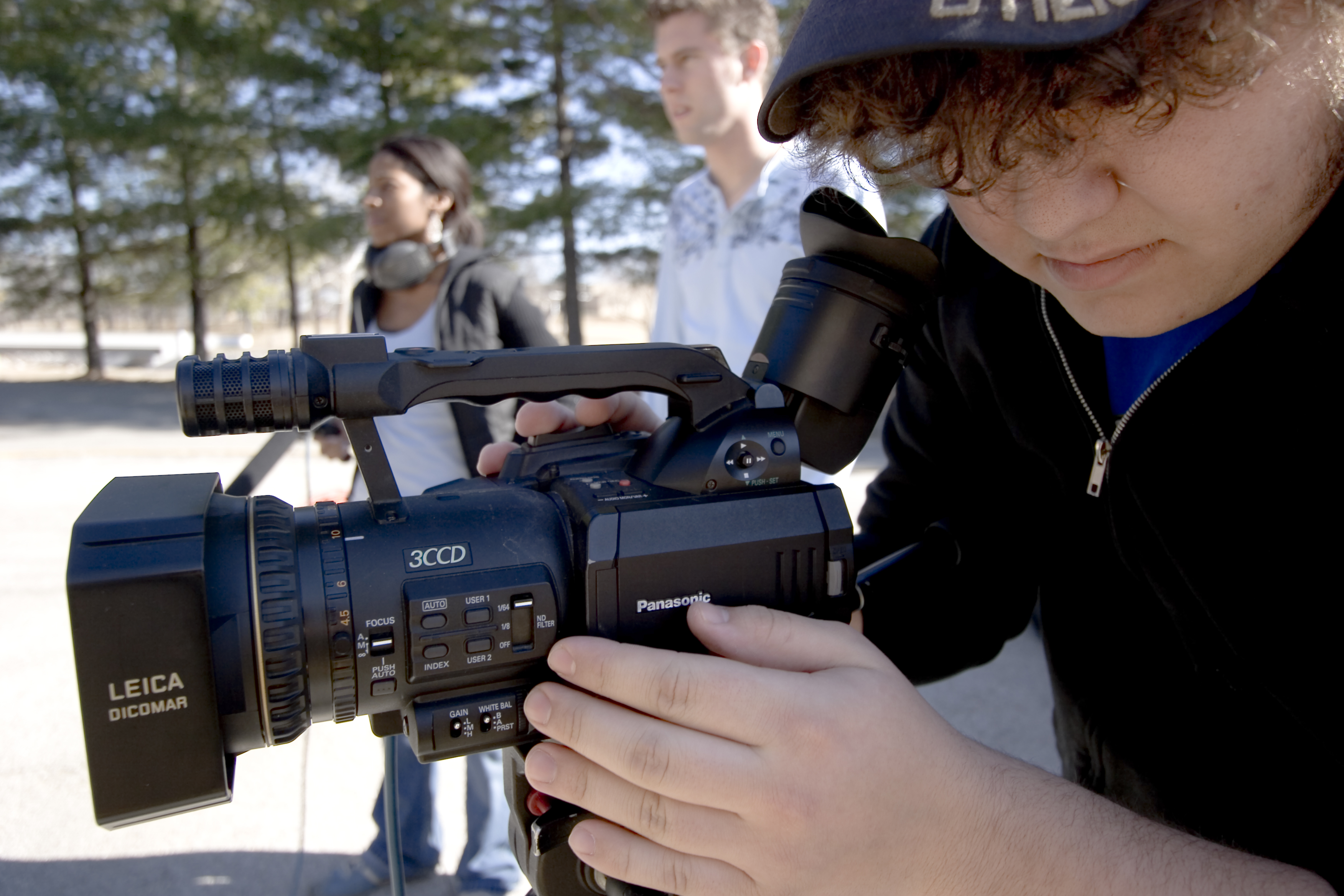
A student with a movie camera

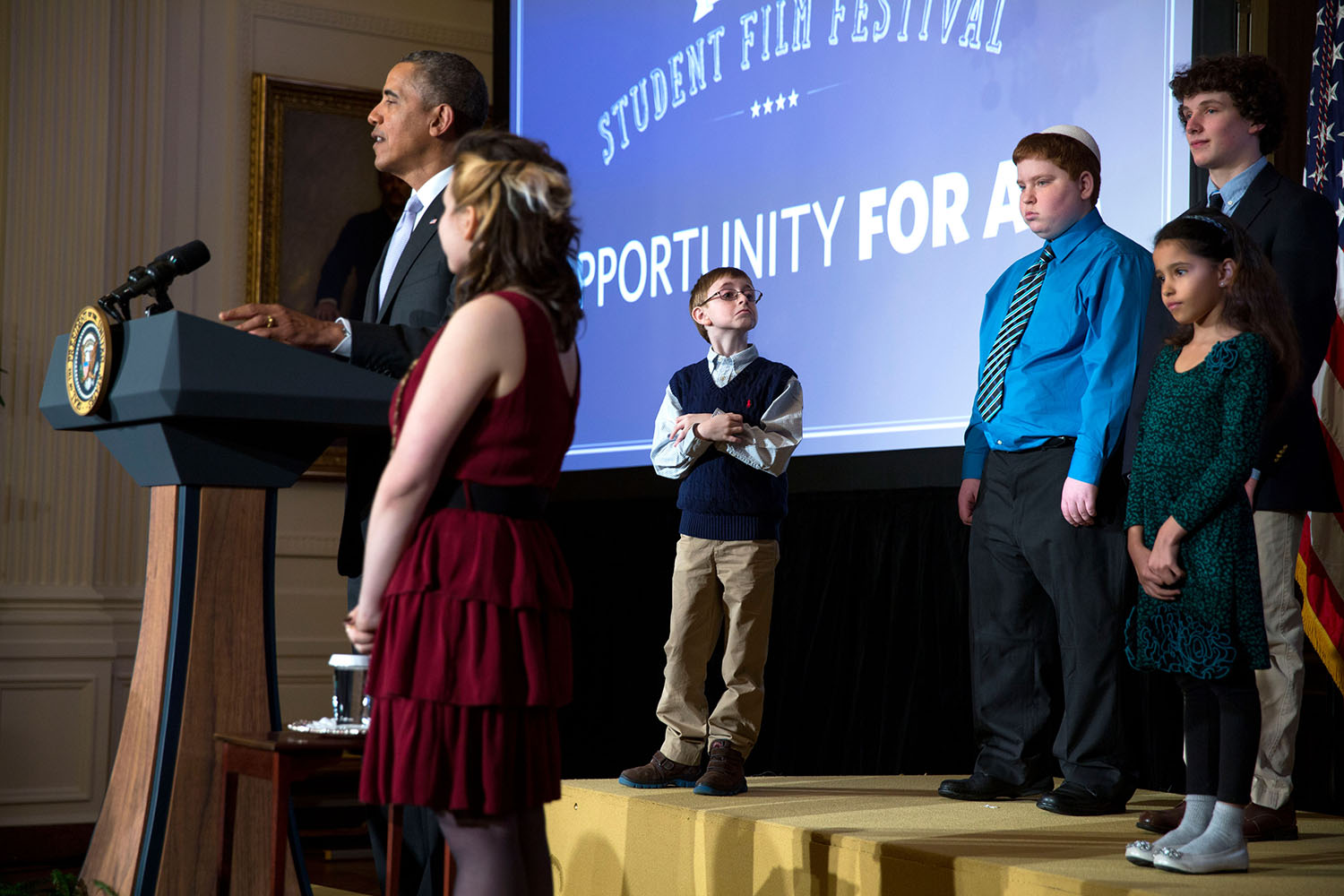
President Barack Obama at the White House Student Film Festival

A student film is a film created by a student enrolled in an educational institution, typically as part of a media or film studies curriculum. It is common for student films to be short, low-budget, and amateur.

== See also ==
- Film school
- Student Academy Awards
