= Zlín Film Festival =

Festival of children's film in Czech Republic

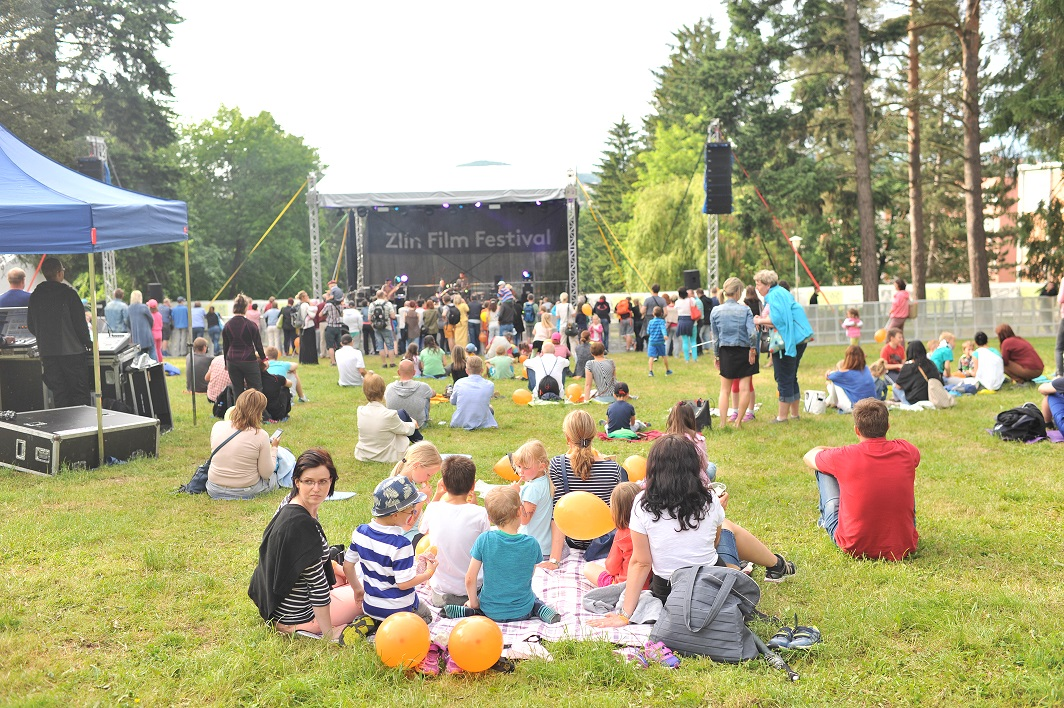
- The festival's open air area
- Location: Zlín, Czech Republic
- Founded: 1961
- Most recent: 2024
- Awards: The Golden Slipper, main festival award
- No. of films: 293 films from 55 countries
- Festival date: 30 May – 5 June
- Website: www.zlinfest.cz/-en/

Zlín Film Festival, also known as the International Film Festival for Children and Youth (Czech: Mezinárodní festival filmů pro děti a mládež) is an annual festival of children's film in Zlín in the Czech Republic, founded in 1961 in the former Czechoslovakia.

== History ==
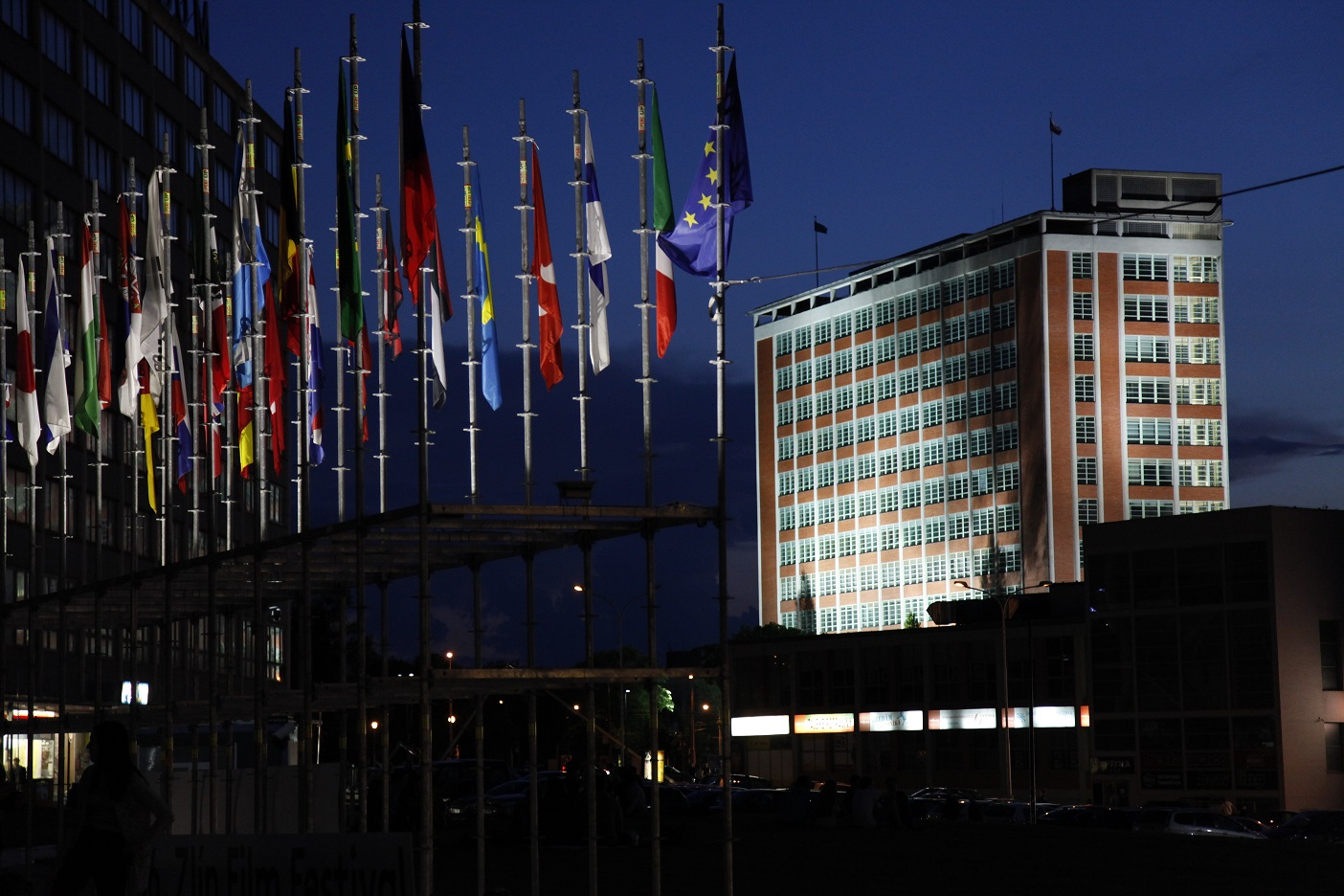
Zlín skyscraper at night

The first festival took place in 1961, 20 years after a previous film festival had been held in Zlín, named Film Harvest (Czech: Filmové žně) or Zliennale. The main program was held in Zlín's Grand Cinema, the largest cinema in Central Europe at that time. The capacity of the building, completed in 1932, was over 2,500. The Grand Cinema is still open today, and hosts the opening ceremony of the festival.

In 1936, entrepreneur Jan Antonín Baťa founded a new film studio in the city, which gradually turned into Czechoslovakia's most prominent centre of filmmaking focused on children and youth. Film-makers such as Karel Zeman, Hermína Týrlová, Alexandr Hackenschmied, Břetislav Pojar and Josef Pinkava created their works in the Zlín film studios.

The 64th edition was held from 30 May to 5 June and featured 293 films from 55 countries.

== Awards ==
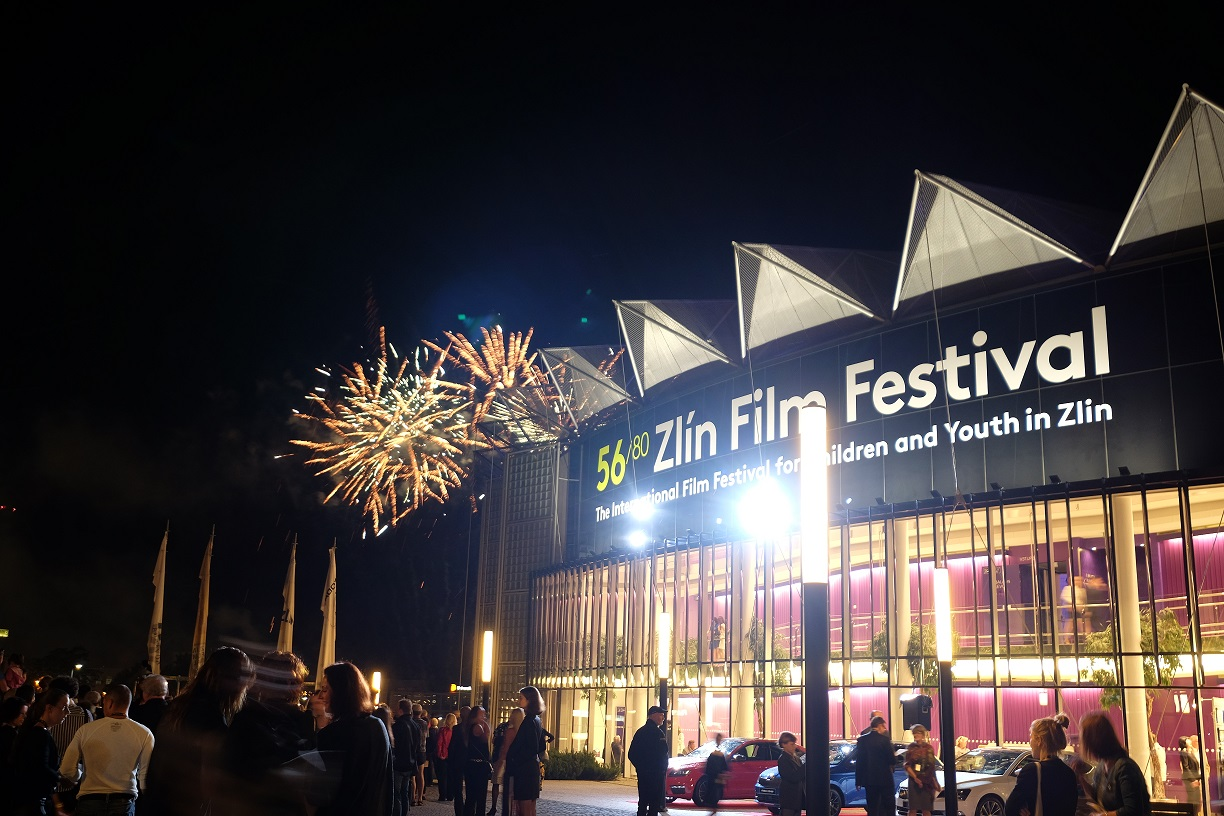
Opening with the fireworks

- Golden Slipper – Main prize awarded to the best feature film in the children's, junior, youth and animation section.
- Karel Zeman Award - Special Recognition for Best Visual Concept in a Feature Film in the Children's Category
- Hermína Týrlová Award for Best Short Animation for Children up to 6 Years of Age
- Main Prize of the Children's Jury for Best Feature Film in the Children's Category
- Main Prize of the Youth Jury for Best Feature Film in the Junior and Youth Category
- Zlín Dog Award for Best Student Film (with prize money of EUR 1000)
- Europe Award - the European Children's Film Association Award for Best European Documentary Film for Young Audience
- Ecumenical Jury Award
- Golden Apple – the City of Zlín Audience Award for Best Feature Film in the Children's, Junior and Youth Category
- ČT: D Audience Award for Best Short Animation for Children

== See also ==
- List of film festivals in the Czech Republic
