= Film Festival of Faculty of Informatics =

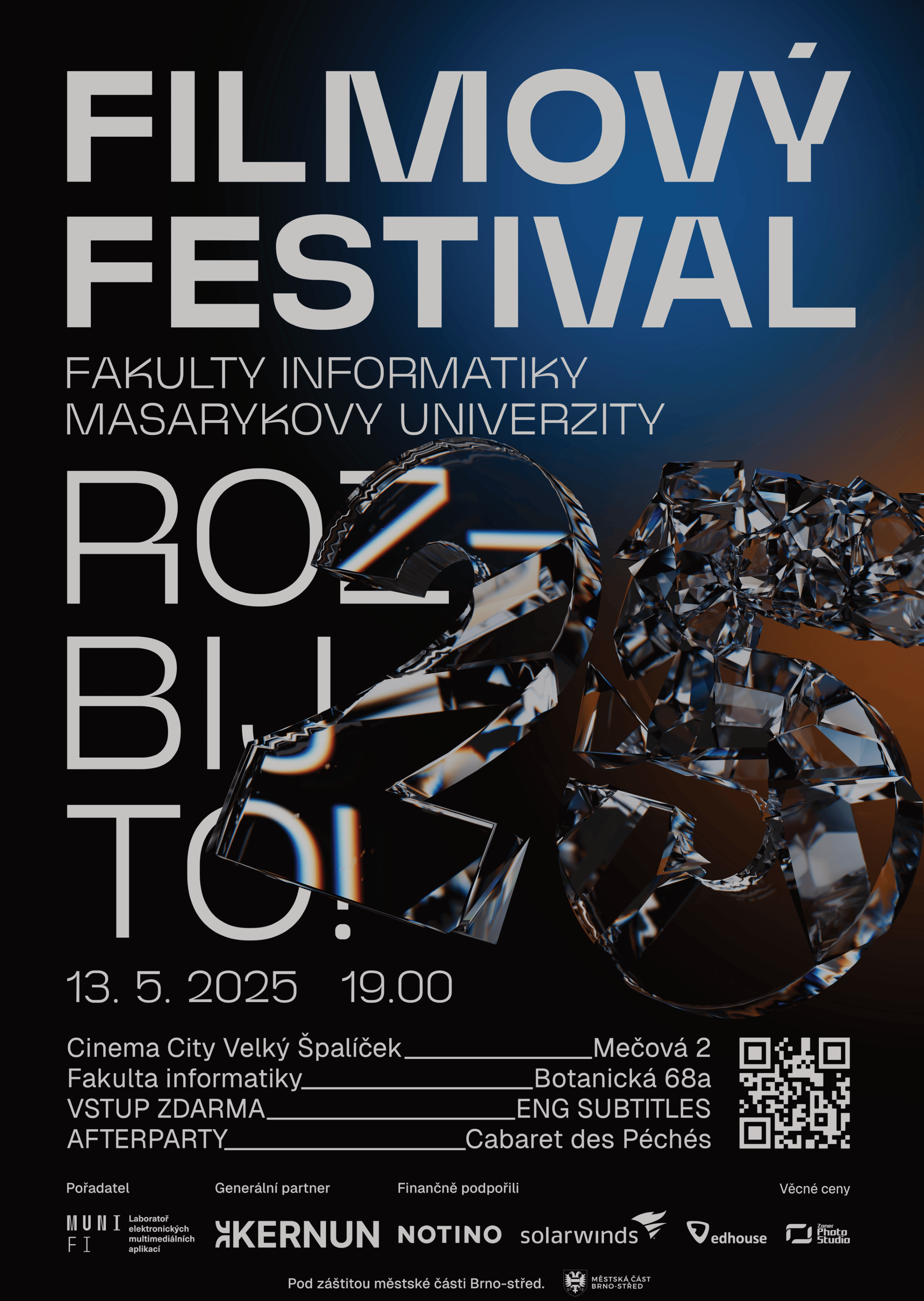
- Country: Czech Republic
- Presented by: Faculty of Informatics, Masaryk University
- First award: 2001
- Website: festival.fi.muni.cz

Film Festival of Faculty of Informatics, Masaryk University (FFFIMU, formerly Film Festival of Faculty of Informatics) is a student film festival held annually in May at the Faculty of Informatics of the Masaryk University in Brno, Czech Republic. Short films of various genres produced by students with an assistance of Laboratory of Electronic and Multimedia Application (LEMMA) are showcased during one festival evening. The festival is held in the building of the Faculty of Informatics and from 2016 - 2023 also in the University Cinema Scala. Each year 800–1000 visitors attend to see the new student projects. Initially, the festival was supervised by the dean of the Faculty of Informatics, since 2011 by the mayor of Brno as well.

== Organization ==
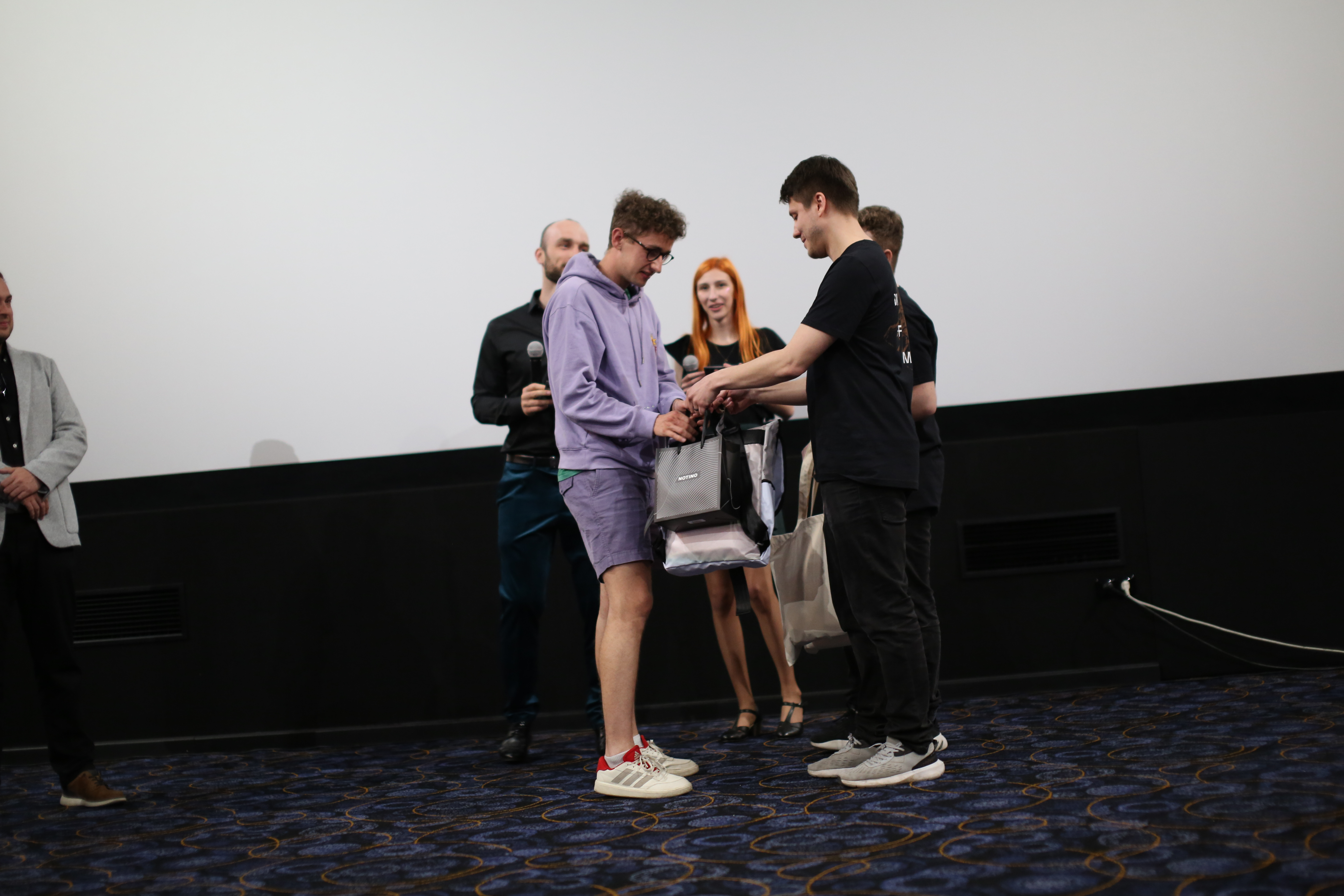
Award ceremony (2025)

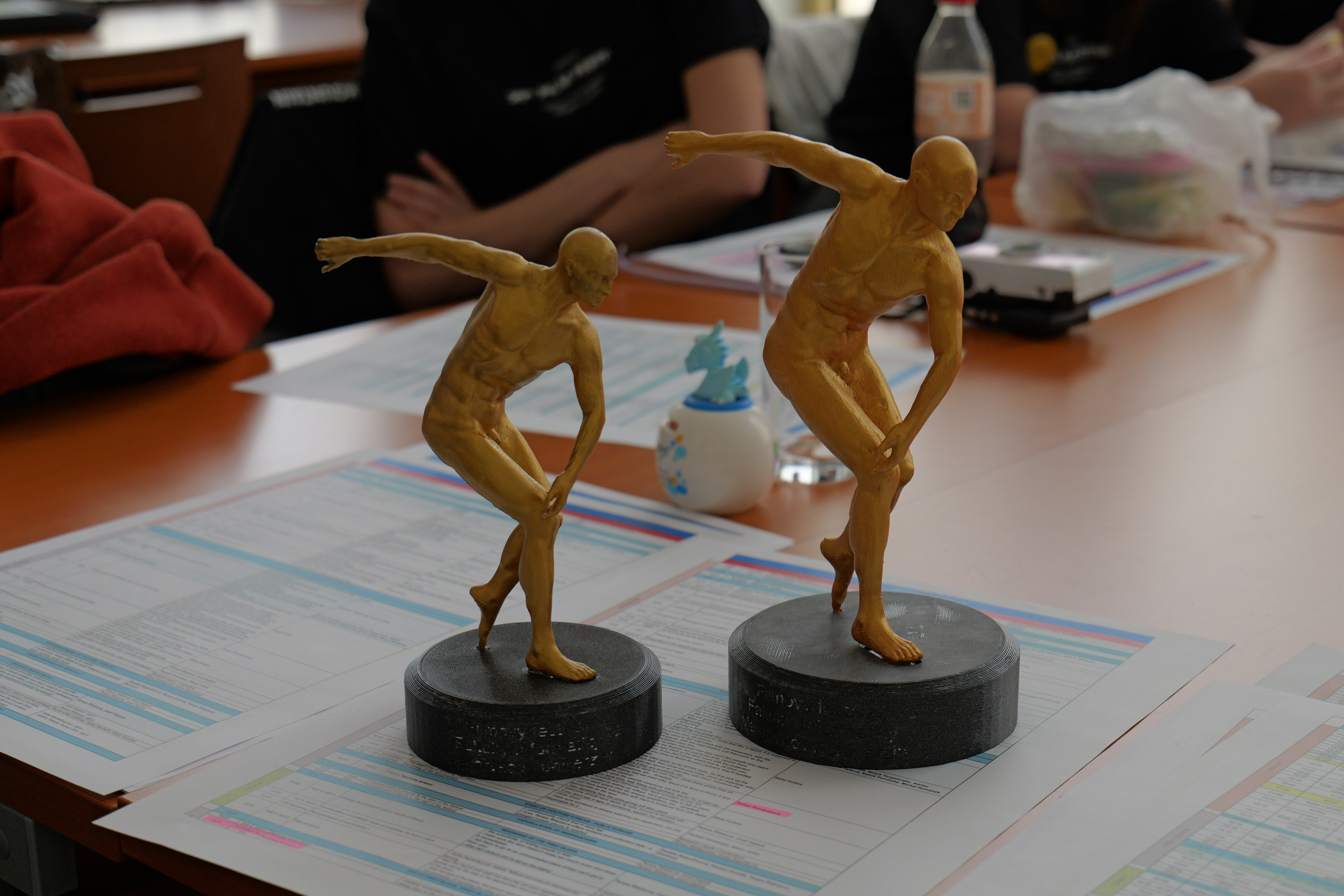
Awards (2025)

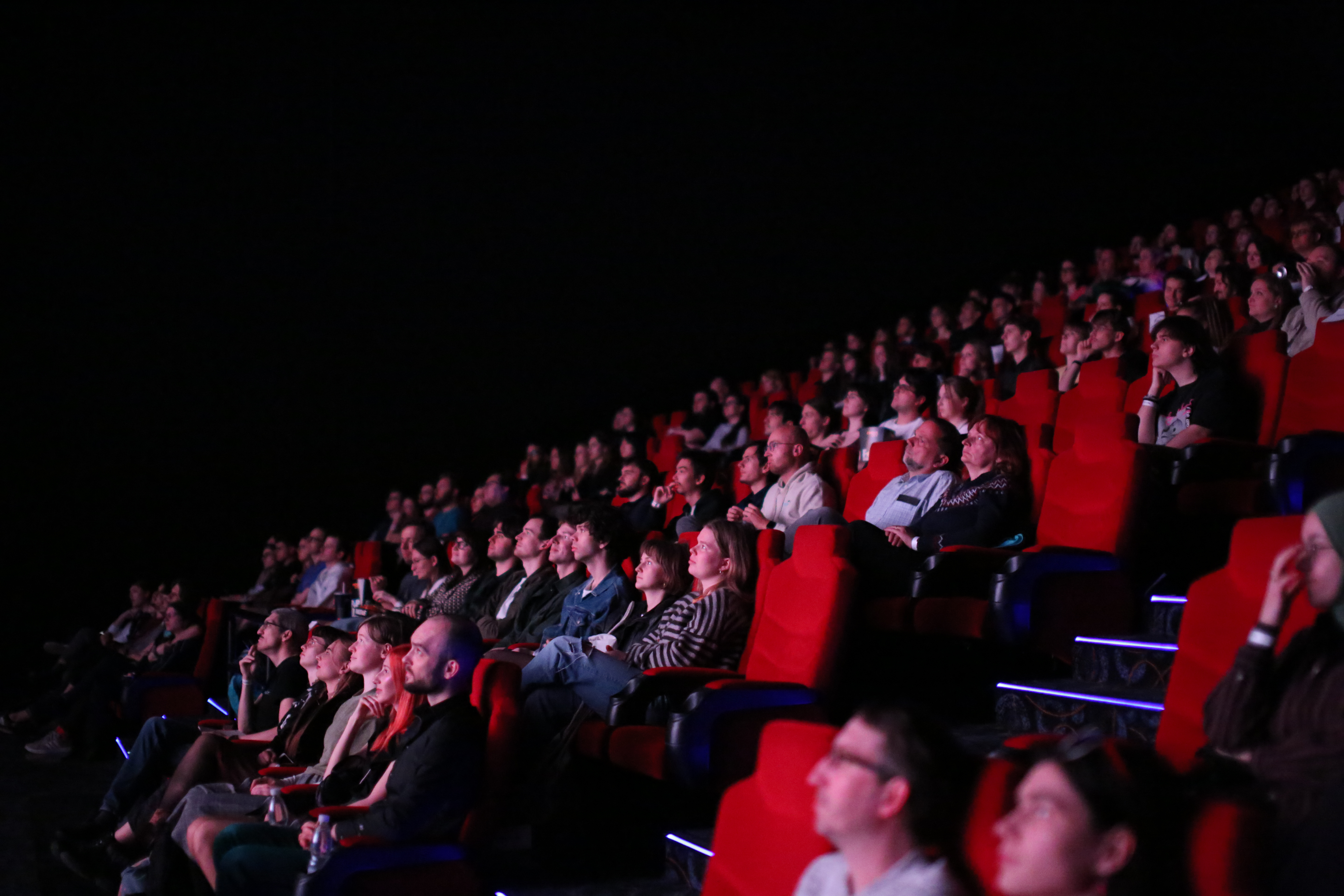
Film festival (2025)

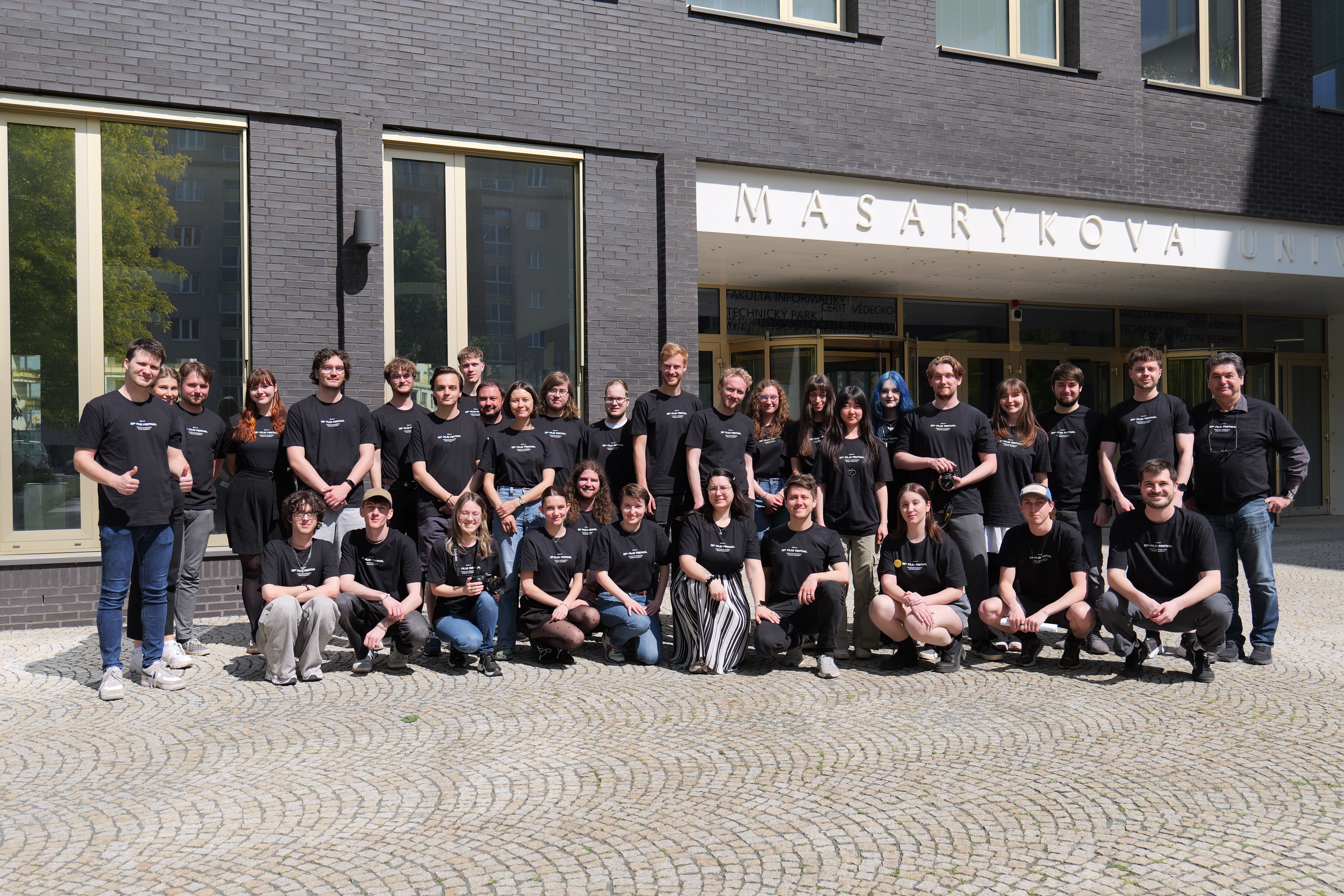
Organizers (2025)

Typically, short films no longer than eight minutes can take part in the festival. The films have to be produced by students or alumni of Masaryk University in the last three years. Most of the films are made in the current academic year, in the courses Základy filmové řeči (Basics of film discourse) and Produkce audiovizuálního díla (Production of audiovisual artefacts) lectured by Petr Sojka, Robert Král and Radovan Hakl. In these courses students learn basic filmmaking knowledge, starting with ideas and story for the film, creating screenplays, filming, production and postproduction. Students also handle acting, sounds, costumes and makeup by themselves.

Every year about twenty films are presented. The best of them are awarded in two categories: Professional jury's choice and Visitor's choice awards. The winners are awarded the Filmobolos trophy and win money as well as prizes from sponsors of the festival.

The festival is organized by students themselves. Every year a new motto and visual style is presented in the form of posters, pamphlets and DVDs. Students have to raise money from various sponsors, they handle public relations, create a trailer and propagation materials, and take care of the official website and social media. Since 2019 it is possible to sign up for the festival externally, which means it is available for people without any association to Masaryk University. Every year the organization of the festival regularly invites high schools and universities from all around Czech Republic to participate in the festival.

== History ==
Organization of the first film festival in 2001 was motivated by the faculty's new opportunities for digital video processing and students' interest in making their own films.

The fourth year of festival (2004) was promoted and sponsored for the first time. The beginning of festival was connected with the release of 10th anniversary of Faculty of Informatics DVD.

The fifth year (2005) was attended by more than 500 visitors.

In 2006 the festival offered various film genres such as documentary films, sci-fi, thriller and comedy. The absolute winner was Relace (Broadcast), a film by Stanislav Hrabí.

Year after, in 2007, a film called Krajina za duhou (The Land Over the Rainbow) by Lukáš Horáček was chosen as the winner of the Visitor's choice award. The Jury chose a romantic film Neznámý (Stranger) by Martina Mičovičová and Michal Oravec as the best.

In 2008 the festival took place during Dies Academicus, in the light of Masaryk University's anniversary. Actors from JAMU also took part this year and thus cooperation with other faculties had begun.

The winner of 9th year was Martin Kacvinský with his film Vir CRT-2116 a jeho přemožitel (CRT-2116 Virus and His Defeater). In the bonus section, lecturer Robert Král introduced his film Doprdelesvěta!

In the 10th year the festival was visited by over 700 people. The first prize was awarded to a comedy by Michaela Miovská and Martin Bakeš named Nebylo nebylo – Jak by asi vypadaly pohádky, kdyby zmizeli kladní hrdinové (Not Once Upon a Time – How Would It Look Like If There Were No Heroes). The jury chose stop-motion film (L)egoist by Miroslav Kolárik as their film of choice.

In 2011 films were presented with English subtitles for the first time. The winners were Mrkvička (A Carrot) — an animation by Jiří Starý, and a stop-motion film Don't Stay Outside by Tomáš Kněžek.

Motto of the 12th festival was Film máme v krvi (Film Is in Our Blood). This year's winner was Radek Gomola with his 1990s RPG-stylized stop-motion film Epic Quest I. The jury chose fake Wikipedia documentary Lež.org (Lie.org) by Radim Urbášek and Tomáš Hůsek as the best one.

The 13th festival was stylized in the like of Hollywood blockbusters. Black (brown) comedy Shit Happened by Jan Kutil won the Visitor's choice award. Jana, a documentary drama based on real events which happened during the Prague Spring, by Zdeňka Sitová was awarded Jury's choice award.

...a přece se točí! (...and yet it's being shot!) was the motto of the 14th festival held on 15 May 2014 during the 95th anniversary of Masaryk University. This year both awards went to Jan Pater and his comedy Výjimka v překladu (Exception in the Translation), which made fun of the number of Slovak students in Czech colleges, mainly in Brno.

The 15th festival was held on 15 May 2015. This year's motto was Střih! (Cut!) as a homage to all film editors. Modern interpretation of a classic Greek myth Pygmalion, a comedy of the same name directed by Tomáš Schmidl, was awarded the Jury's choice award. The visitor's choice award went to Shitman: A New Hero Is Born — a parody of Hollywood blockbuster trailers, directed by Samuel Briškár.

The 16th festival was held on 20 May 2016. For the first time ever, the screenings took place at the Faculty of Informatics and simultaneously at the university cinema Scala in Brno. The motto was slightly provocational, asking people whether they would want to experience the films themselves — Chceš to taky? (Do you want it too?). The visitor's choice award went to Vysněná Domácnost (Dreamed Household) — a comedy by M. Humaj. The Jury's choice award was given to cute_cats.avi, an experimental piece by J. Szlauer and J. Špiřík.

On 17 May 2017, the 17th festival - the second one, which was screened at both Faculty of Informatics and University cinema Scala, took place. The number of people attending this year was speculated to be the highest among festivals so far, as people came to "Move the Picture" (this year's motto). The winner of the visitor's choice award was Gin, a short philosophically comedic sketch by František Kovařík. The Jury's choice award went to Co se dělo ve škole? (What happened in school?), a multi-genred sketch directed by Lýdie Palečková.

18th festival took place on 18 May 2018. Like every year, there were screening of short films from students of Masaryk University as well as graduates. The festival screening took place at two locations simultaneously - at Faculty of Informatics and University cinema Scala. The winner of the visitor's price was Pavel Čadek's "Nelajkla mi status" and the Jury's choice award won film "Šelma".

19th FFFIMU was held on 19 May 2019 and its motto was "Film nebo NIC" (Film or NOTHING). Films were screened at two locations, university cinema Scala and at Faculty of Informatics. This year festival was part of the program of MUNIFESTO festival, which celebrated 100th anniversary of founding MU. This integration put a requirement on the films to contain some link to Masaryk University. The visitor's choice award went to "Jedničky a nuly" by director Matěj Škop. The Jury's choice award won film "BaDumTss" by directors J. Galanda, Š. Mačejovský and P. Smolnický. For the first time in festival's history, Professional category was introduced. Winner of this category is "Mám Upův syndrom" by directors Pavel Čadek and J. Vrbková.

Due to the COVID-19 pandemic, the jubilee twentieth year of the festival took place online in the form of an online broadcast on 22 May 2020. The announcement of the results and the award ceremony took place live a week later, although without a live audience. The theme of the year was "Uncensored", the name FFFIMU was often stylised as F*** M*. The winners were announced in three categories. The general sponsor's award was won by the comedy film "Architektka" ("The Architect") by the "Tucet Špinavců" collective. The first place in the Jury's choice category was awarded to the atmospheric piece "12 hodín" ("12 Hours") directed by Kristián Grupač. The visitor's choice category was won by Michal Románek with his conspiracy document parody "ODHALENIE!!!!!!" ("REVELATION!!!!!!").

21st film festival also took place online and its theme was “Connection”. Its goal was to imply that the festival has been connecting students, lecturers and everyone who yearns for movie creation, despite the complications brought upon by the pandemic. First place of the jury was awarded to a movie Figures by Nikola Minářová and the audience award went to a comedy called Seed by Ondřej Kocár.

22nd film festival took place on 20.5.2022, with “From a different perspective” as its theme. This time students focused on individuality of perceiving and creating a film. The main prize of the jury received a drama by Tatiana Pavolková called Too many balloons and the audience chose a comedy called Parasite by Jaroslav Vůjtek inspired by Eva Dolejšová's book The Parkourist as their winner.

23rd festival was held on the 19th May 2023 and its topic was "On the Edge". The main prize of the jury received short drama called ALWAYS AND EVERYWHERE (collaboration of Polina Kotova, Eva Novotná, Sára Vašičková, Barbora Zouharová) and the audience chose comedy Corpses in the Woods 2 by Dorota Palicová as their winner.

24th edition of the festival was held on 17th May 2024 with the theme "You will remember this.". The jury's prize went to the dystopian animated film I'll Die in This House (dir. Adriana Bendžalová), and the audience's prize went to the film Right Before the Eyes of makers Šárka Portešová and Martin Bertko. The movie was inspired by the real experience of the grandfather of Šárka, one of the directors.

The 25th anniversary edition of the festival took place unusually on Tuesday, May 13th, 2025. The theme of the year was Break It!, inspired by the demolition of Building D at the Faculty of Informatics. The motif of breaking boundaries reflected the creativity of student films, which often challenge established norms and expectations. For the first time, the festival was held not only in Building A and S of the Faculty of Informatics but also in downtown Brno at the Velký Špalíček multiplex cinema, thus reaching a wider audience beyond the university environment. The Audience Award was won by The Truth About Brno by Stanislav Kemeň, a humorous take on a conspiracy theory suggesting that all Brno residents might secretly be transforming into trams. For the first time in the festival's history, the Jury Award was won for a second time by the same filmmaker Sára Vašíčková, who received it again for her film Notice of Readiness.

The 26th edition of the festival took place on 13th May 2026, under the theme “Resonate”, which highlighted the fact that short films can resonate in a theater just as powerfully as feature-length films. As is tradition, the festival was held at the Faculty of Informatics, and for the second year in a row, it also took place at the Velký Špalíček cinema. A new feature of this year’s festival was its partnership with the university event MUNI DAY, as part of which the festival also took place at the University Campus Bohunice. Both the Audience Award and the Jury Award went to Stanislav Slovák for his black comedy about death, All Cats Are Black in the Dark.

== See also ==
- List of film festivals in the Czech Republic
