= Anifilm =

Animated international film festival in Czech Republic

- Status: Active
- Genre: Multi-genre
- Location: Liberec
- Country: Czech Republic
- Inaugurated: 2010; 16 years ago
- Most recent: 2025
- Filing status: Non-profit
- Website: www.anifilm.cz/en/

Anifilm is an international festival of animated films held in the Czech Republic. It was founded in 2010. Until 2019, it was held in Třeboň, and since 2020, it is held in Liberec. The festival features the most interesting films from the entire spectrum of animation, with awards in the categories of student work, design for television and made to order, and Best Film.

== Awards ==
The best feature film for adults
Year	Film title	Director	Country of origin
2011	Surviving Life	Jan Švankmajer	Czech Republic
2012	Alois Nebel	Tomáš Luňák	Czech Republic
2013	Consuming Spirits	Chris Sullivan	United States
2014	Cheatin'	Bill Plympton	United States
2015	Possessed	Sam Conflictivos	Spain
2016	Anomalisa	Charlie Kaufman, Duke Johnson	United States
2017	Louise by the Shore	Jean-François Laguionie	France
2018			

The best feature film for children
Year	Film title	Director	Country of origin
2011	Fimfarum – The Third Time Lucky	Vlasta Pospíšilová, Kristina Dufková, David Súkup	Czech Republic
2012	Painting	Jean-François Laguionie	France; Belgium
2013	The Day of the Crows	Jean-Christophe Dessaint	France; Belgium
2014	Boy and the World	Alê Abreu	Brazil
2015	The Tale of the Princess Kaguya	Isao Takahata	Japan
2016	Phantom Boy	Jean-Loup Felicioli, Alain Gagnol	France; Belgium
2017	My Life as a Courgette	Claude Barras	Switzerland; France
2018			

The best short film
Year	Film title	Director	Country of origin
2011	Divers in the rain	Priit Pärn, Olga Pärn	Estonia
2012	Oh Willy …	Emma de Swaef, Marc J. Roels	Belgium; Netherlands; France
2013	Father	Ivan Bogdanov	Bulgaria; Croatia; Germany
2014	Worst-Case Scenario	Kristjan Holm	Estonia
2015	The World of Tomorrow	Don Hertzfeldt	United States
2016	Periferie	David Coquard-Dassault	France
2017	Decorado	Alberto Vázquez	Spain
2019	Animal Behaviour	David Fine and Alison Snowden	Canada

The best student film
Year	Film title	Director	Country of origin
2011	Věnováno tmě	Soňa Jelínková	Czech Republic
2012	Case	Martin Živocký	Czech Republic
2013	An Alien	Martin Máj	Czech Republic
2014	Plug and Play	Michael Frei	Germany
2015	The Bigger Picture	Daisy Jacobs	United Kingdom
2016	Happy End	Jan Saska	Czech Republic
2017	Pipka	Renata Gasiorowska	Poland
2019	Good Intentions	Anna Mantzaris	United Kingdom

The best music video
Year	Film title	Director	Country of origin
2015	Zhu: Paradise Awaits.	Tomek Ducki	Poland
2016	The Eye of the Storm	Masanobu Hiraoka	Japan
2017	Uri Nakayama: Spring Time-Old Man	Hoji Tsuchiya	Japan
2019	Seth Schwarz and Be Svendsen: Elves of Karoo	Yves Paradis	Germany

The Best Abstract and Non-Narrative Animation
Year	Film title	Director	Country of origin
2018	Max Hattler	Divisional Articulations	Germany; Hong Kong
2019	Caibei Cai	Half Asleep	United Kingdom

Audience award for the best Czech film
Year	Film title	Director	Country of origin
2016	Až po uši v mechu	Filipa Pošivač, Barbora Valecká	Czech Republic

== Gameday ==
Gameday is a video game festival that has been a part of Anifilm since 2010. Visitors can try multiple video games there and meet their developers. The Czech Game of the Year Awards were held there until 2017.

== See also ==
- Anifest
- List of film festivals in the Czech Republic
