= List of film festivals in the Czech Republic =

This is a list of film festivals in the Czech Republic.

== Active festivals ==
Name	Est.	City	Type	Details
Academia Film Olomouc	1966	Olomouc	International; Documentary	Scientific and educational films from multiple scientific fields.
Anifilm	2010	Třeboň	International; Animated Films	
Bollywood Film Festival	2004	Prague	Special Interest	
Festival fantazie	1996	Chotěboř	Special interest	
Film Festival of Faculty of Informatics	2001	Brno	Student film	
Finále Plzeň Film Festival	1968	Plzeň	National	Festival focuses on Czech feature and documentary films.
Jihlava International Documentary Film Festival	1997	Jihlava	International; Documentary	The largest festival of creative documentary film in Central and Eastern Europe
Karlovy Vary International Film Festival	1946	Karlovy Vary	International	The most prestigious film festival in the Czech Republic.
Mezipatra	2000	Prague	Special interest	
MOFFOM (Music on Film-Film on Music)	2008	Prague	Film music	
One World Film Festival	1999	Prague	Special interest	Human rights film festival
Prague Independent Film Festival	2016	Prague	International	The festival focuses on independent cinema.
Zlín Film Festival	1961	Zlín	International	

== Defunct ==
Name	Years	City	Type	Details
Anifest	2002-2013	Teplice	International; Animated Films	
Cinema Mundi International Film Festival	2010-2016	Brno	International	
Febiofest	1990-2022	Prague	International	
Fresh Film Festival	2004-2014	Karlovy Vary (until 2009); Prague (from 2010)	International; Student film	
