= Andrew Holtz =

American journalist

Andrew Holtz is a former CNN Medical Correspondent, and an independent journalist covering health and medicine as Chief of HoltzReport. He is the author of The Medical Science of House, M.D.. His second book was The Real Grey's Anatomy: A Behind-the-Scenes Look at the Real Lives of Surgical Residents,. A second book on "House" was published in March 2011. House M.D. vs. Reality: Fact and Fiction in the Hit Television Series, examines topics and issues from recent seasons of the Fox TV series.

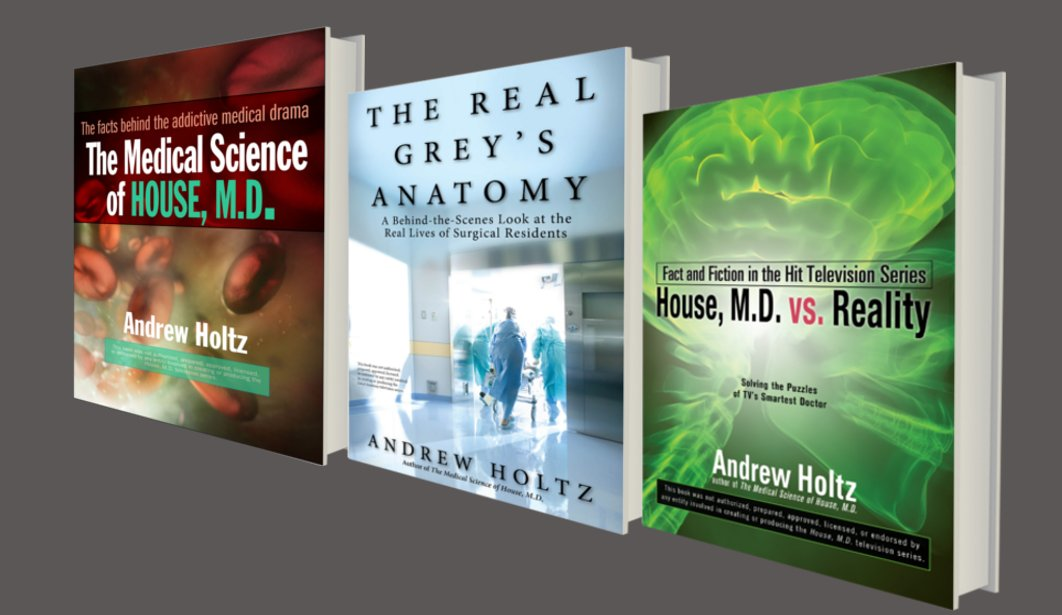
Books by Andrew Holtz

Holtz was Senior News Editor and Chief Anchor for MDiTV, a Portland, Oregon-based online video channel. MDiTV halted news production in mid-2010.

Holtz wrote the ScriptDoctor: Medicine in the Media column for Oncology Times.

Holtz's work has appeared on the PBS HealthWeek program, ScientificAmerican.com, the-scientist.com, and many other news media outlets. He reviewed news coverage of medicine for HealthNewsReview.org.

Holtz is a former member of the board of directors of the Association of Health Care Journalists. He was President of the board from 2000 to 2004 and Interim Executive Director in 2004–05. Holtz mentors journalists in the Reporting Fellowships on Health Care Performance and the AHCJ International Health Study Fellowships.

After attending the prestigious New England boarding school, Phillips Exeter Academy, Holtz went on to Stanford University. After graduating from Stanford with a BA, he went on to acquire a Master of Public Health from the Oregon MPH program.
