= Music on Film-Film on Music =

Music on Film – Film on Music (MOFFOM) is a film festival held annually in October in Prague, Czech Republic and dedicated to music films. The 2008 festival presented 58 films and attracted more than 10,000 viewers.

MOFFOM focuses on documentaries but also presents concert films, musicals, music-centric dramatic features, music videos and shorts, cine-concerts (film screenings with live musical accompaniment), live performances and film workshops. In 2007 it spearheaded the founding of the Association of Music Film Festivals, which includes similar events in Europe, North America, Asia, and the Middle East.

== History ==
MOFFOM was established in 2004 as part of a non-profit association dedicated to the convergence of music and film. Spanning four-to-five days, festival events occurred in several cinemas and other venues in central Prague.

MOFFOM's programming included honors and tributes to signal figures in music film, such as Fred Frith, Julien Temple and Don Letts, as well as special thematic sections. In 2006 an Audience Choice Award was added, and for the first time in 2008 MOFFOM awarded a jury prize.

The 2004 festival debuted The Residents "Commercial Album" interactive DVD. The 2007 festival featured a concert by Glen Hansard and Markéta Irglová, stars of the Oscar-winning film Once. The 2008 festival featured an exclusive video greeting from Lifetime Achievement Award honoree Pete Seeger.

== Awards ==
=== Honors and tributes ===
2004 Ron Mann, Allan Miller
2005 Henry Hills, Don Letts, Albert Maysles, Jan Roháč, Larry Weinstein
2006 Simon Broughton, William Ferris, Ladislav Rychman, Julien Temple
2007 Fred Frith, Hana Hegerová
2008 Pete Seeger, Marta Kubišová

=== Audience Choice Award ===
2006 Sierra Leone's Refugee All Stars
2007 Nömadak Tx
2008 Gogol Boredello Non-Stop

=== Jury Prize ===
2008 Solo.

Awards of Merit were given to two other films: KISS Loves You and African Underground: Democracy in Dakar.

== See also ==
- Designblok
- List of film festivals in the Czech Republic
