= Bollywood Film Festival =

Coordinates: 50°4′55″N 14°25′32″E

Bollywood Film Festival (Czech: Festivalu Bollywoodského filmu) is a film festival held annually in Prague, Czech Republic. It was first launched in 2004 and its mission is to present India's Bollywood films to a Czech audience. The song/dance and dramatic storylines which are typical of many Indian films are finding popularity in European culture.

== See also ==
- List of film festivals in the Czech Republic
