= Community Forests International =

Canadian environmental organization

- Founder: Jeff Schnurr; Mbarouk Mussa Omar; Daimen Hardie; Zachary Melanson; Estelle Drisdelle; Dale Prest
- Type: Non-governmental organization
- Location: Sackville, New Brunswick, Canada
- Website: forestsinternational.org

Community Forests International (CFI) is a charity that works with sustainability in forests, based in Sackville, New Brunswick, Canada. The organization was founded in 2007 by Jeff Schnurr. After traveling to over 35 countries and working as a Canadian tree-planter, Schnurr landed in Pemba, Tanzania. While living there, he was approached by a group of local fishermen who were interested in tree planting as a means for stabilizing the local environment.

CFI's operating model is communities need to make their own change. In April 2009, CFI helped Tanzanians in Pemba incorporate their own organization, Community Forests Pemba (CFP).

In 2010, Jeff was named one of Canada's Top 10 volunteers by the CBC Canada's Champions of Change.

== Community Forests Pemba (CFP) ==
Traditional agriculture, charcoal production and population expansion have left natural forest systems largely depleted across the island of Pemba, Tanzania. For this reason Pembans have needed to import wood and charcoal while soil systems have been depleted.

While living in Pemba, Schnurr worked in partnership with Mbarouk Mussa Omar, a local activist to organize gardeners, tree growers and foresters in order to fight land degradation. Since 2007, CFI in partnership with CFP has launched 14 community-owned projects in Tanzania. As of 2013, over 1,000,000 trees have been planted in Pemba.

== Whaelghinbran Farm ==
In 2012, CFI raised over $100,000 to purchase Whaelghinbran Farm, a 580-acre farm and forest property near Sussex, New Brunswick, Canada. The land belonged to Clark Phillips and Susan Tyler, a couple who had been farming organically and restoring the forest since the early 70s. The property boasts more than 70 acres of certified organic farmland; in its early years Phillips and Tyler hosted Green Party MP Elizabeth May.

Through CFI, the farm is currently being used as an incubator space for the next generation of Canadian land stewards. The organization currently hosts workshops, an organic farmer apprentice program and horse logging at the farm.
