= Seattle Film Institute =

American film school

Coordinates: 47.617417°N 122.302723°W

- Type: Private for-profit film school
- Established: 1994
- Affiliations: Northwest Career Colleges Federation
- President: David Shulman
- Faculty: approx. 25 Full and Part Time
- Students: 50 Full Time; 50 Part Time
- Location: Seattle, Washington (U.S. state), United States
- Campus: Urban
- Website: sfi.edu

The Seattle Film Institute (SFI) is a private for-profit film school in Seattle, Washington. Founded in 1994, SFI offers part-time classes, bachelor's degrees, master's degrees, and certificate programs in film and digital video production.

== Academics ==
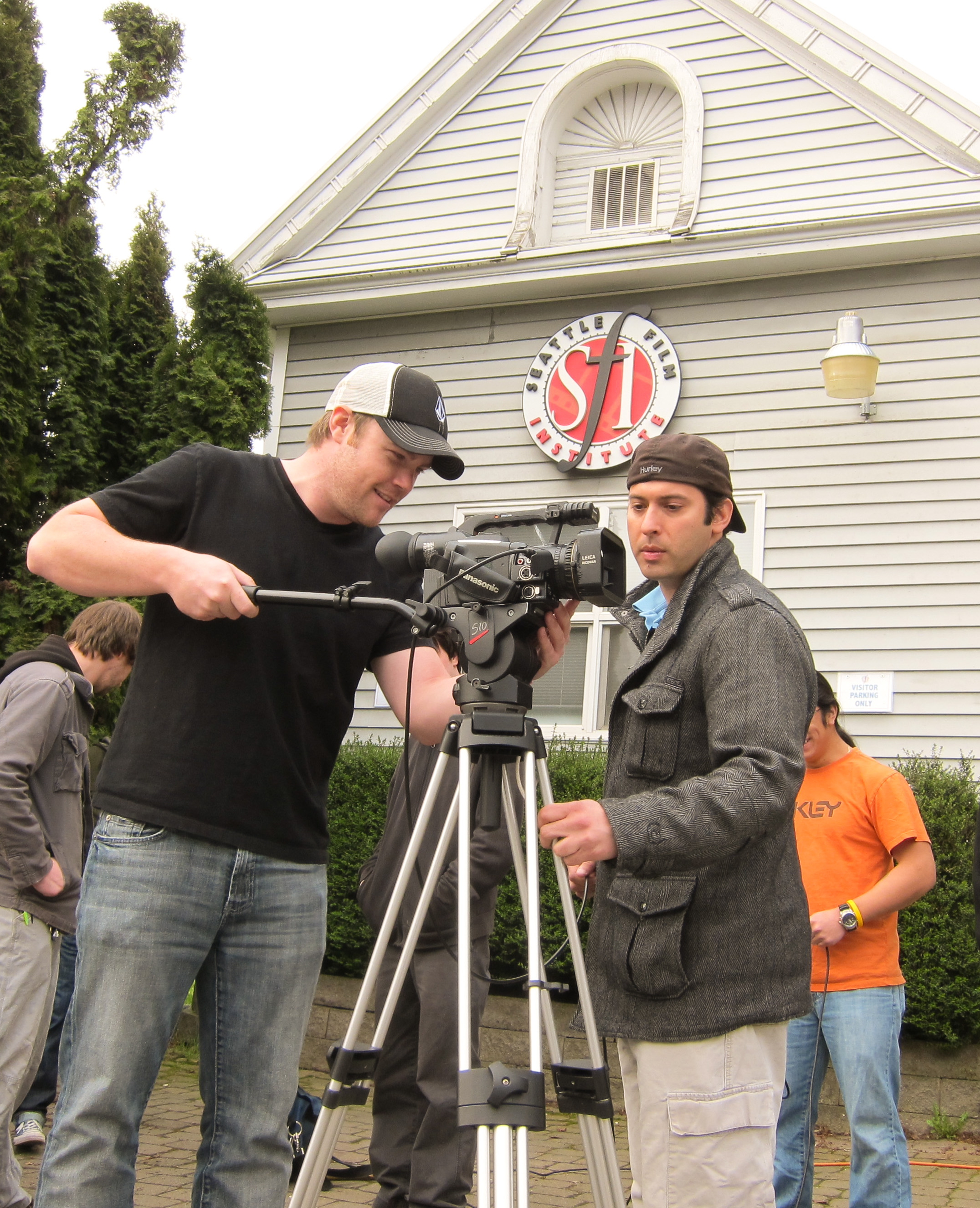

SFI offers both full-time and part-time programs.

A Master of Arts degree in Film Production focuses on the producing and business aspects of film, from pre-production to exhibition. The Master of Fine Arts in Filmmaking and Producing is an intensive full-time program covering screenwriting, directing, camera and lighting, editing, and producing. The MFA is hands on, and students produce many individual and group projects. The Master of Music in Film Composition trains composers in the art of scoring music for motion pictures.

SFI offers a B.A. completion degree, with thematic concentrations in Filmmaking, Audio Production for Film, Acting for Film, and Motion Graphics. A completion degree enables students to transfer an AA degree or general education credits from other colleges to obtain a full Bachelor of Arts degree.

The full-time certificate program is a 50-week intensive program, awarding a Certificate in Film Production upon successful completion of all classes, at least 10 group and individual film and video projects, and a feature-length screenplay. Classes meet four to five days a week, in the broad topic areas of Film Analysis & History, Screenwriting, Production, and Post Production.

Extension classes are offered individually both evenings and weekends. Extension classes cover screenwriting, film production, video production, film history, film business and distribution, editing, lighting, and audio editing, among others.

== Location ==
SFI is located in the Interbay district of Seattle, between the Magnolia and Queen Anne neighborhoods and near Seattle Pacific University. The location is close to parks, libraries, cinemas and live theaters, restaurants, and many other cultural attractions.

== Facilities ==
The school moved to a 10,000 sq. ft. building in Seattle's Interbay neighborhood in 2013. It houses administration offices, a 48-seat theater, filming studio, classrooms, sound mixing room, editing lab, library and film equipment checkout room. Production equipment includes Arriflex and Aaton 16mm and Super16mm, and Super8 cameras; RED, Sony, Canon and Panasonic Digital HD cameras, editing stations with Final Cut Pro and Adobe Creative Suite, Arriflex and Mole Richardson tungsten, and LED location lighting, grip equipment, and location audio recording gear.
