= White House Student Film Festival =

Film Festival in Washington, D.C.

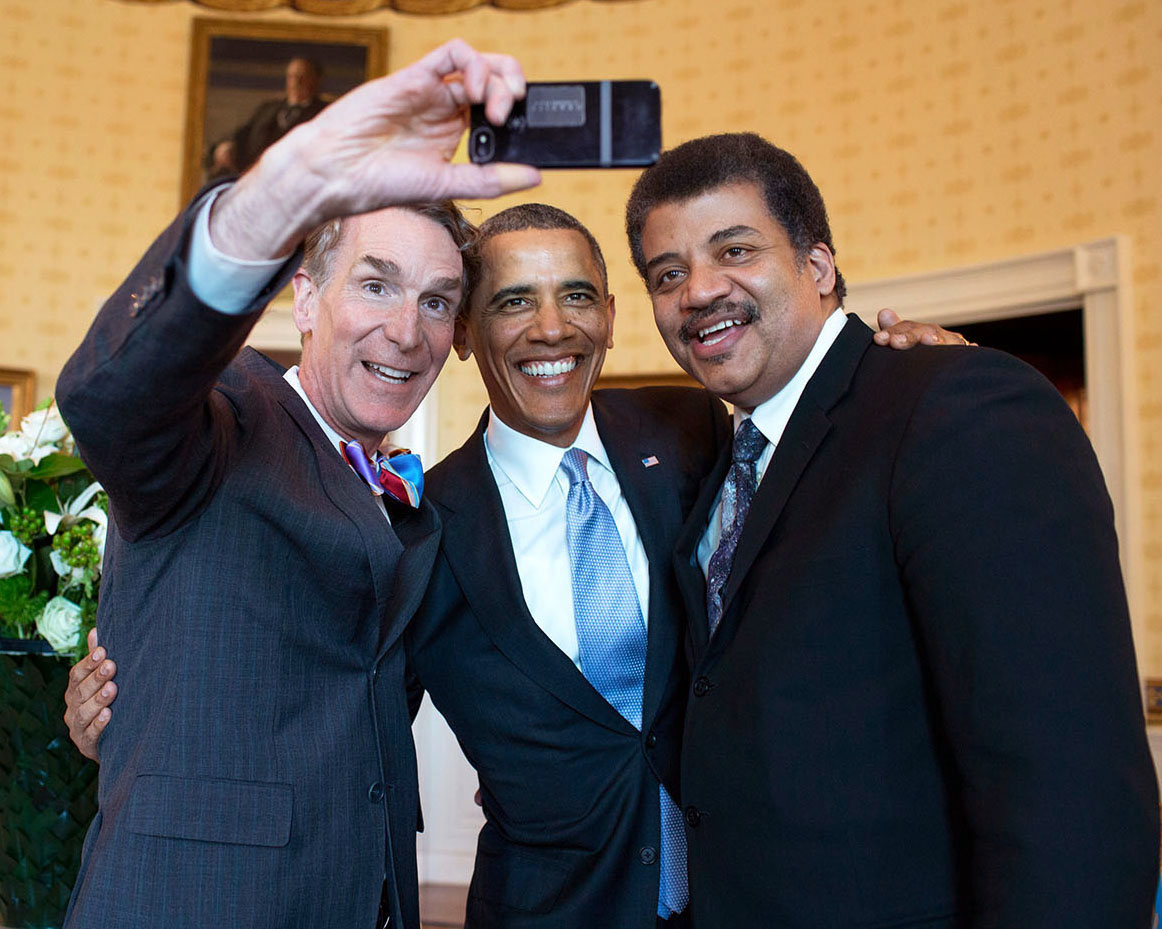
- President Barack Obama poses for a selfie with Bill Nye, left, and Neil DeGrasse Tyson in the Blue Room prior to the White House Student Film Festival, Feb. 28, 2014. (Official White House Photo by Pete Souza)
- Founded: 2014
- Hosted by: American Film Institute, White House

The White House Student Film Festival was an annual film festival held by the White House and co-sponsored by the American Film Institute from 2014 to 2016. The festival was announced in November 2013 as part of the Barack Obama administration's initiative to bring "America's classrooms into the 21st century with high-speed internet and cutting-edge educational technology."

The festival has not been held after 2016 following the end of Obama's presidency in January 2017.

== 2014 ==
During the inaugural festival in 2014, students in Kindergarten through 12th Grade were able to submit short films about "why technology is so important, and how it will change the educational experience for kids in the future." 16 videos were selected to be screened out of over 2,500 submitted videos. Several celebrity guests were in attendance, including Kal Penn, Neil DeGrasse Tyson, and Bill Nye.

The 16 video selections were sorted into four categories: Young Visionaries, Future Innovators, World of Tomorrow, and Building Bridges.

== 2015 ==
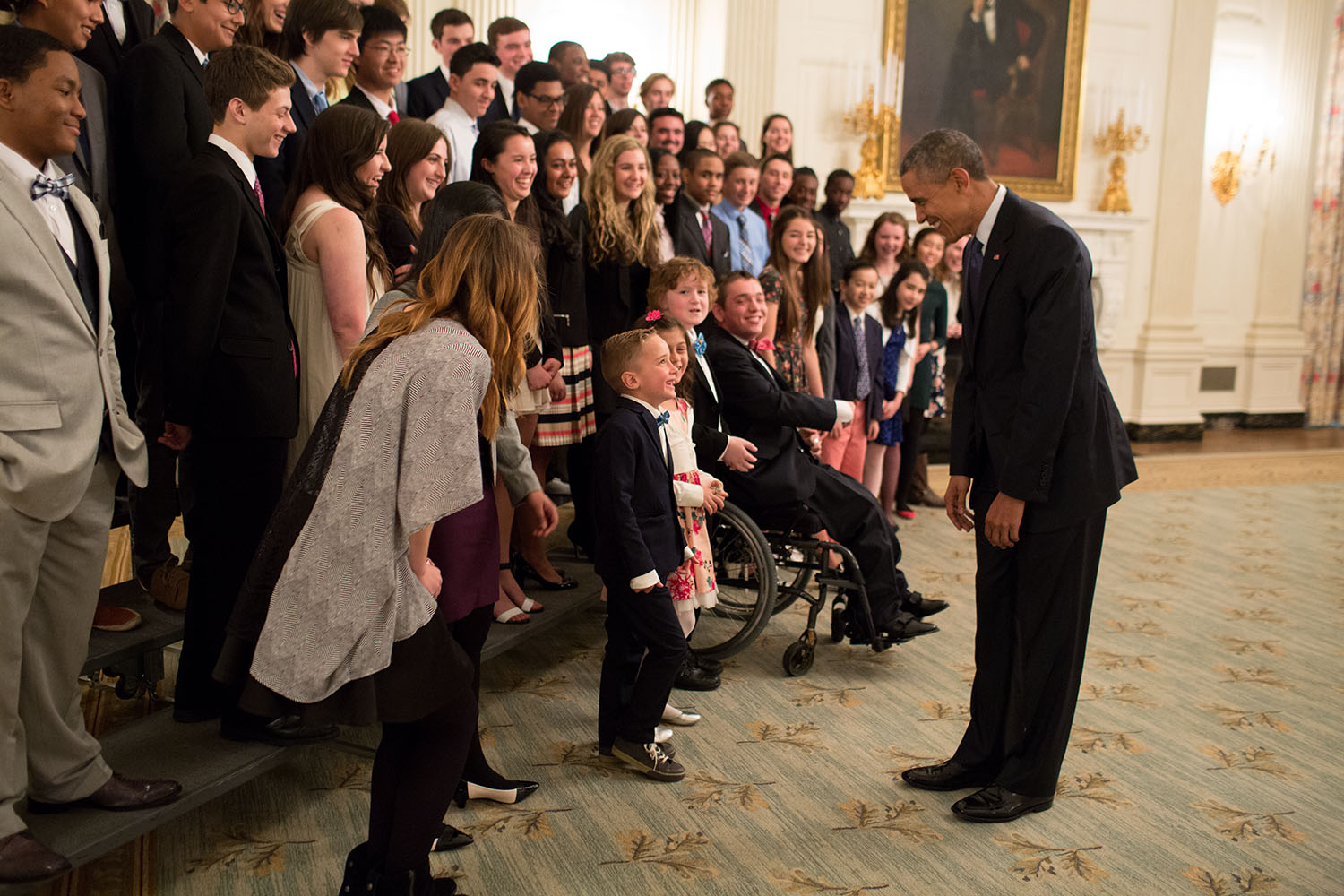
Barack Obama interacts with student filmmakers in the State Dining Room, March 20, 2015

The second year of the festival took place at the White House and the Newseum in Washington, DC on March 20 and 21, 2015, with a theme of "the Impact of Giving Back".

== 2016 ==
The event was held on October 2 before the White House's South by South Lawn festival. The theme was "The World I Want to Live In".

== Selections ==
=== 2014 ===
Young Visionaries

- Discovery by Tiffany Lin
- Thru the Lens of a Tiger by Alicia Oluhara and Jason Perry
- Stay Curious: Technology in the Classroom by Kayla Briet
- Teleportation Investigation of 2014 by The Extrazzlers - Caroline Proffit, Elizabeth Russell, Natalie Koeritzer, and Lexus Wolf
- Beyond the Crossfire by Gabriel Garcia, Tirsa Mercado, Rachel Walden, and High Tech High
- Technology, Documentary, My Dad, and Me by Shelly Ortiz

Future Innovators

- PIP by Richard White, Nicolas Ramey, and Emil Willmann
- Technology and Me by East Silver Spring Elementary 1st Grade
- Art Tech Collaboration by Highlands and Mill Street Elementary Schools

World of Tomorrow

- Tomorrow's Classroom by Alexander Emerson
- Technology In Education: A Future Classroom by Daniel Nemroff
- Full S[T]EAM Ahead – How Technology Rocks the Classroom by Miles Pilchik, Gabrielle Nafie, and the children of SciTech Kids

Building Bridges

- Double Time by Joshua Leong and Stephen Sheridan
- Hello From Malaysia by Kira Bursky
- Alex by Mitch Buangsuwon and Alex Buangsuwon
- A Day In the Life of Kyle by Justin Etzine, Kyle Weintraub, Marni Rosenblatt, and Rachel Huss
