= Carolina Film Institute =

- Type: Private
- Established: 2008
- President: David Shulman
- Location: Greenville, South Carolina; 34°53′48″N 82°27′30″W
- Website: http://www.carolinafilminstitute.com

The Carolina Film Institute (CFI) is a film school, founded in Greenville, South Carolina in 2008. It is affiliated with Seattle Film Institute founded in Seattle in 1994. CFI offers both part-time classes and certificate programs in film and digital video production, and film history.

== Curriculum ==
CFI offers both full-time and part-time programs.

The 40 Week Total Immersion Filmmaking Program awards a Certificate in Film Production upon the completion of all classes. The Program includes the production of 10 group and individual film and video projects, the writing of a complete feature-length screenplay and a comprehensive grounding in Film History. Classes meet 5 days a week, 4 hours each day. The core classes are: Film History and Analysis, Screenwriting, The Production Process, Documentary and Non-Fiction Filmmaking and Digital Post Production.

Part-time program classes are offered individually both evenings and weekends. As of the Spring 2009 term, CFI began offering a new part-time certificate program in filmmaking, that allows part-time students to earn a certificate by enrolling in classes over time, or to combine with courses in the full-time program. Part-time classes cover film production, video production, film history, editing, lighting, and audio editing, among others.

CFI is licensed by the South Carolina Commission on Higher Education.

== Facilities ==
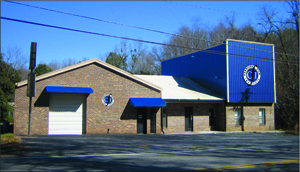

The school occupies a 5,000-square-foot (460 m^{2}) building used for administration, classrooms, editing labs and film equipment checkout. Production equipment includes Arriflex 16mm and Super16mm, and Super8 cameras; Digital Video and HDV cameras, Final Cut Pro editing stations, lighting, grip equipment, and audio gear.
