= Festival fantazie =

Speculative fiction convention in the Czech Republic

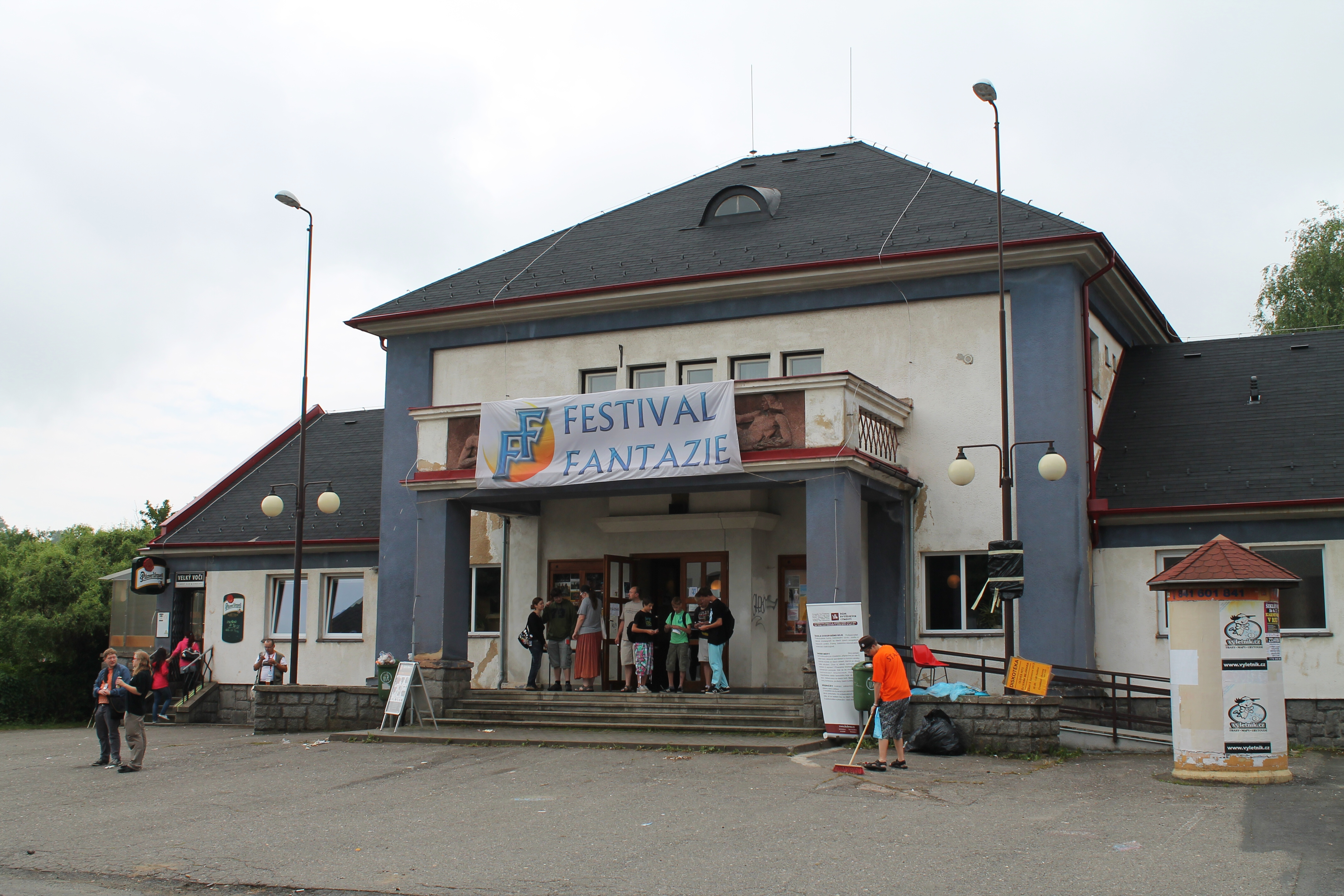
Entrance of the Festival fantazie in Chotěboř (2013 edition).

Festival fantazie festival of speculative fiction in the Czech Republic and one of the largest in Central and Eastern Europe. As for number of particular programs it surpasses the longest running science fiction convention Worldcon. In this sense Festival fantazie belongs among the biggest festivals of its kind in the world. In 2007 the festival was visited by 2135 individuals, who stayed for 5 days on average, Festival fantazie Speciál in autumn entertained 640 participants.

Festival is devoted to fantasy and wide spectrum of related subjects. The program includes films literature, games, it is focused on science fiction and future, astronomy, modern technologies, fantasy, horror, mythology, mysteries, military and history. Visitors are offered the opportunity to see films and TV shows, take part in large number of games and contests of all kinds. Furthermore, meetings with famous personalities, both vocational and humorous lectures, theatre and fencing performances are organized and much more.

Festival has been held in Chotěboř every year since 1996 in June and July. Shorter Festival Fantazie Speciál takes place in October. The organizer is independent non-profit civic organization SFK Avalon. Václav Pravda is the festival director.

== Program ==
Program runs in several parallel program lines. Lines come under program sections which may also be parallel:

- Festival fantazie – the main program, special programs
- Festival Járy Cimrmana – Jára Cimrman and other art and science geniuses
- Avalcon – literary branch
- GameFest – free gaming

The core of the festival consists of meetings with well-known writers, actors and artists and both vocational and humorous speeches, presentations (by specialists or fans), panel discussions. Visitors have opportunity to see both the newest films and films which are not commonly available, TV shows or documentary films. Fan activities include fanfilms and dramatic performances among others.

A computer hall (with network games, Wii consoles) is prepared within the GameFest block. Board games, card games, table role-playing games are available. Live action role-playing games (LARP) are run. Competitions and tournaments are organized in many games.

In 2007 the program included over 1200 activities and events. That is more than Worldcon 2006 had (1057 events).

The festival organizer allows fan groups to organise and present their own programs. This close cooperation with participants provides the festival with a broader and more diverse program than those of many similar events. While smaller conventions often cease to operate after a few years, Festival Fantasy provides organisational support and services to facilitate their continuation under the festival’s patronage.

=== Program lines ===
This is a list of program lines at Festival fantazie. Note that links to the lines' webpages are mostly in Czech.

Manga & anime AMcon	Stargate	Battle of the Hornburg
Animera	Harry Potter	PP: OrcLYMPIAD
Avalcon	ChinaCon	RPG
Babylon 5	InfantilCon	SeriesCon
SlayerCon	Jára Cimrman	Soulcalibur III
CultCon (British TV shows)	Jatkon + paintball	SpaceCon
Red Dwarf	Klasikon	Special FF program
DDR	LostCon	SpyCon
DozorCon	MaelströM	Star Wars
DunaCon	MaelströM films	Star Wars: SithCon
FanFest	MysteryCon	Studna (horror)
Film mix	Narnia & Eragon	Star Trek TrekFEST
FutureCon	NightCon	WebCon
BSG Galacticon	OnCon (Online games)	Xena, Hercules, Charmed
GameFest: Computer games	The Lord of the Rings	The Witcher
GameFest: Board & card games		The Witcher: Baptism of fire LARP

== Speciál ==
Festival fantazie Speciál is a happening tied to Festival fantazie which is organized by SFK Avalon too. Speciál is linked with the summer festival, chosen programs appear again, but it offers variety of original program. Speciál is aimed to satisfy fans who prefer a smaller event to bustle of a large one or who missed desired program of Festival fantazie and also to enable further socializing across various interest groups.

== Background ==
Festival provides organizers and attendees with reliable background. The centre is located in House of Culture Junior with halls and lecture rooms for circa 400 attendees. A snack bar, tearoom and workshop are situated here too. In proximate neighbourhood there are Druzba Cinema (capacity for 200–300 visitors), Sport Hall (for 190 visitors) and Sokolovna (for 200–400 visitors, snack bar, wine bar).

Accommodation is prepared in several categories from hotel to sleeping-bag places. The maximum capacity includes 13 buildings (Guest-house Bene, Filippi hotel, U Zámku hotel, Vyočina hotel, Business Academy hostel, Special boarding school, Sport hall, Smetanova and Buttulova elementary schools etc.).

Visitors have access to the Internet through festival computers or they can browse festival Wi-Fi network.

== History ==
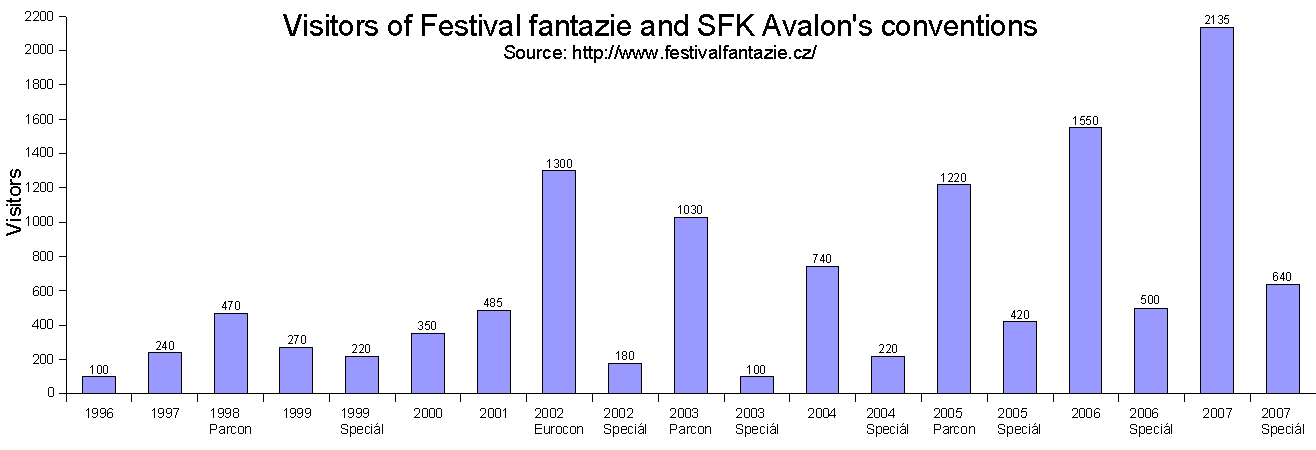
Graph of Festival fantazie and related conventions visit rate

SFK Avalon Club, predecessor of organization in charge of the festival, was founded 12 February 1994. Among its first activities it issued Zbraně Avalonu magazine or organized Corwinovy spisy contest or brutal short stories competition. In 1996 it failed in candidacy for Parcon organization and decided to make Avalcon, convention of its own which was realized twice. In 1998 SFK Avalon led Par-con with 470 visitors, Avalon's co-founder Václav Pravda was elected a member of Czech Fandom Council. Three years of Festival Fanta ia Avalon and two Avalon Specials (1999, 2002) followed, with an increasing attendance rate and an expanding program. At the 20th EuroCon

in Gdynia Avalon succeeded in candidacy for EuroCon 2002 in Chote or.

== See also ==
- List of film festivals in the Czech Republic
