= MDiTV =

American health sciences media networks

Lazzara Media Production Network (LMPN.tv) and Medical Doctor Internet Television (MDiTV) are health sciences media networks founded by Robert R. Lazzara M. D., Diederik Sjardijn and Thomas Overbey. Portland, Oregon served as the headquarters for its production and administrative operations.

The personalization of media through the wider use of portable devices and broader Internet-connectivity has given rise to a number of websites that offer content that is typically found through traditional media outlets; such as network television and cable television. The Nielsen Company reported year-over-year online video streams per viewer and time per viewer were up 13 percent from December 2009 compared to December 2008. A report from the Portland Business Journal stated that "MDiTV is targeting a growing market opportunity" by making its content "available for iPads, smart phones and new TV devices in development by Apple and Google." This strategy mirrors other online syndicated video content providers, like Hulu.
