= CFI Financial Group =

Emirati financial services company

- Type: Private
- Industry: Financial services
- Founded: 2015
- Headquarters: Dubai, United Arab Emirates
- Area served: International
- Key people: Ziad Melhem (CEO), Federico Cirulli (chairman) Hisham, Mansour (co-founder), Eduardo Fakhoury (co-founder)
- Website: cfi.trade

CFI Financial Group (also known simply as CFI) is a financial services group founded in Beirut in 2015 as part of Credit Financier Invest SAL, a Lebanese company founded in 1998. It later relocated its headquarters to Dubai in 2017. The group operates through multiple regulated entities across jurisdictions including the United Kingdom, the United Arab Emirates, Cyprus, Jordan, South Africa, Egypt, Bahrain, Lebanon, Azerbaijan and Colombia, and received authorisation in Brazil. CFI offers trading in stocks, forex, commodities, indices, ETFs, and CFDs.

== History ==
CFI Financial Group was established in Beirut, Lebanon, in 2015 by Hisham Mansour and Eduardo Fakhoury as part of the international expansion of Credit Financier Invest SAL, originally founded in 1998.

In 2017, the company's headquarters relocated to Dubai to strengthen its presence in the Middle East.

In 2018, CFI expanded to Jordan, becoming one of the first international brokerage groups to acquire both local and international licenses from the Jordan Securities Commission (JSC). In the same year, CFI opened its UK office in London.

In 2019, CFI opened an office in Port Louis, Mauritius.

In November 2022, CFI expanded into the Egyptian market by acquiring local brokerage firm El Mahrousa.

In January 2024, CFI Financial Group launched a new office regulated by the Securities and Commodities Authority (SCA) in Dubai. In December 2024, it launched operations in South Africa, establishing an office in Cape Town following regulatory approval from the Financial Sector Conduct Authority (FSCA).

CFI reported trading volumes of $1.03 trillion in Q3 2024. In February 2025, CFI opened an office in Baku after acquiring AzFinance Investment Company in Azerbaijan.

In June 2025, the group appointed Ziad Melhem as Group CEO; co-founders Hisham Mansour and Eduardo Fakhoury became chairman and vice chairman, respectively.

In July 2025, CFI's subsidiary in Bahrain was granted a Category 2 Investment Business Firm licence by the Central Bank of Bahrain. In October 2025, CFI opened an office in Manama.

In January 2026, Finance Magnates reported that CFI ended Q4 2025 with about $2.07 trillion in trading volume and total 2025 trading volume of $6.4 trillion.

In April 2026, CFI received authorization from Banco Central do Brasil to operate in Brazil as a Corretora de Títulos e Valores Mobiliários, allowing it to offer local clients access to equities and fixed-income securities. In May 2026, CFI launched operations in Colombia, following authorisation by the Superintendencia Financiera de Colombia in 2025.

== Operations ==
CFI serves clients from over 100 countries, offering trading in stocks, forex, commodities, indices, ETFs, and CFDs.

By 2026, the group held 15 regulatory licences or authorisations worldwide, following approval in Brazil, alongside existing authorisations in the United Kingdom, the United Arab Emirates, Cyprus, Jordan, South Africa, Egypt, Bahrain and Colombia. The group operates through multiple entities, including in offshore or lightly regulated jurisdictions such as Vanuatu and Seychelles.

== Marketing ==
In 2023, the group partnered with the King Hussein Cancer Foundation and Center to fund a new medical unit dedicated to underprivileged patients. It also introduced a client donation initiative, matching contributions made from trading activities to further support the foundation.

CFI has entered into sports sponsorship and brand-ambassador agreements. Reported partnerships have included the Nissan e.dams Formula E Team, the Lebanon men's national basketball team, the Jordan Basketball Federation, and AC Milan. In January 2024, CFI announced a partnership with Paris Saint-Germain FC through June 2026.

In April 2025, CFI was named "Official Online Trading Partner" of the 2025 EuroLeague Final Four. In July 2025, Finance Magnates reported that CFI became the official online trading partner of Etihad Arena in Abu Dhabi. Also in July 2025, CFI announced a partnership with the Egyptian Basketball Federation.

In July 2024, CFI named Lewis Hamilton as a global brand ambassador. In July 2025, CFI named Maria Sharapova as a global brand ambassador.

CFI's 2023 sponsorship of Sheffield United drew criticism over the group's links to Dubai and the United Arab Emirates' human rights record, including restrictions on freedom of speech, discrimination against women, and criminalization of same-sex relationships.

== Controversy ==
Prior to obtaining licensing in the European Union, CFI had offered cross-border investment services without local authorization. In October 2016, Italy's financial regulator, CONSOB, issued a warning that CFI was operating without the required license to provide investment services to Italian residents. This notice was subsequently distributed among other European financial regulators. In May 2022, the group's Cyprus entity reached a €150,000 settlement with the Cyprus Securities and Exchange Commission (CySEC) over possible violations of anti-money laundering and counter-terrorist financing requirements.

In September 2025, Oman's Financial Services Authority (FSA) revoked the licence of CFI Financial LLC, citing non-compliance with anti-money laundering requirements and exceeding the scope of the licence by marketing non-Omani securities without authorization.
